= Economy of Hamilton, Ontario =

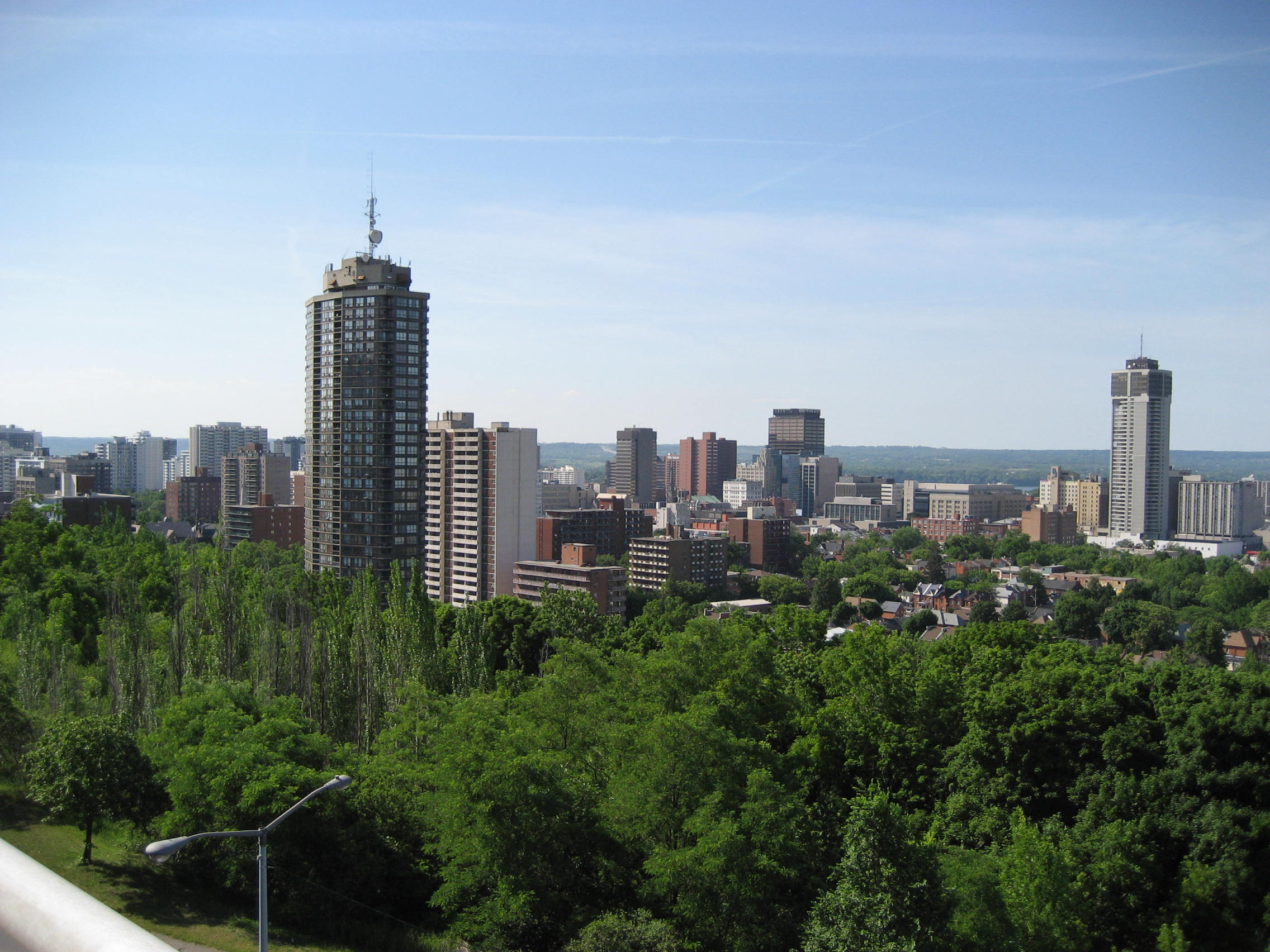
Skyline view from Arkeldun Avenue, mountain access road

Hamilton, Ontario is a port city in Canada.

== Biggest employers ==
Hamilton's new work scene.
Sector	1996	2006	% change
Manufacturing	64,750	57,630	-11%
Health care & social assistance	30,630	40,080	31%
Educational services	19,550	30,830	57%
Construction	15,680	28,080	78%
Finance, insurance, real estate	22,150	26,380	19%
Professional, scientific and technical	13,400	23,930	79%

== Construction and real estate ==
Average house prices in Hamilton were up almost 6 per cent in January 2007 compared to January 2006. The Realtors Association of Hamilton-Burlington says that 'Consumers are continuing to show confidence in resale housing' and reports that 823 properties were sold in January 2007, a 1 per cent decrease from the same period last year. The number of properties listed rose by almost 6 per cent to 1,723. During January 2007, 786 homes were sold, including 650 houses and 136 condominium properties. The average price of non-condominium properties was $268,729 while the average price of a condo was $193,735.

The city of Hamilton is ranked in its top 10 Ontario places (No. 5) to invest in real estate. Hamilton's economic diversification which is shifting away from the dirty steel town impression, new immigration to Canada from other parts of the country settling here, low mortgage rates, migration of housing refugees from Toronto, improved GO Transit service, completion of the Red Hill Valley Parkway and booming development at Hamilton airport in Glanbrook are all reasons for the new bloom on Hamilton's real estate market. The report also goes on to add that "Hamilton has lots of properties that are undervalued." All of this, however, was calculated before the 2008 economic recession.

Hamilton's Real Estate Hot Zones:

- East End: Anywhere within 500 metres of a ramp from the Red Hill Valley Parkway is expected to open up economic potential in the area, especially the east mountain because of the "easier commute."
- Ainslie Wood and Westdale: Anywhere near McMaster University where investors continue to buy property as student housing.
- West End: Anywhere within 15-minutes of McMaster Innovation Park (being developed on Longwood Road)
- Downtown: Central city, north of Main Street. A lot of activity by landlords picking up two-family and three-family homes as income properties.

Overall ($) Value of Construction Trends in City of Hamilton.
	2001	2002	2003	2004	2005	2006	2007
Residential	287,621,422	352,759,590	262,214,137	380,297,684	375,133,564	407,331,942	395,335,459
Commercial	71,141,096	107,703,082	58,914,038	75,335,634	79,082,418	108,702,496	126,391,840
Industrial	55,240,986	50,435,054	87,276,714	60,982,261	72,466,405	72,266,757	63,337,586
Institutional	97,338,063	150,485,309	252,615,083	74,466,736	106,656,106	85,829,122	210,207,720
Miscellaneous	3,979,497	2,951,608	3,374,797	4,084,400	7,541,108	8,417,498	6,446,743
TOTALS	515,321,064	664,334,643	664,394,769	595,166,715	640,879,601	682,547,815	801,719,318

== Economy ==
The census divisions of the original Golden Horseshoe marked red with recent additions in green.

The most important economic activity in Ontario is manufacturing, and the Toronto-Hamilton region is the most highly industrialized section of the country. The area from Oshawa, Ontario around the west end of Lake Ontario to Niagara Falls is known as the "Golden Horseshoe" and the centre of it is Hamilton. Under the 2001 Statistics Canada definition, the population was 6,704,598 in the 2001 census. In 2006 the population was approximately 8.1 million people. Major industrial products include motor vehicles and parts; iron, steel, and other metal products; foods and beverages; electrical goods; machinery; chemicals; petroleum and coal products; and paper products.

Golden Horseshoe The phrase was first used by Westinghouse President, Herbert H. Rogge, in a speech to the Hamilton Chamber of Commerce on January 12, 1954: "Hamilton in 50 years will be the forward cleat in a "golden horseshoe" of industrial development from Oshawa to the Niagara River ... 150 miles long and 50 miles (80 km) wide ... It will run from Niagara Falls on the south to about Oshawa on the north and take in numerous cities and towns already there, including Hamilton and Toronto."

=== Steel industry ===
As the largest steel manufacturing city in Canada and home of the two Steel giants; Stelco and Dofasco where 60% of all the steel in Canada is produced. It is the steel and metals manufacturing capital of Canada. In the last decade, Hamilton's heavy industry reached a stable level, Stelco has returned to profitability and on August 26, 2007 United States Steel Corporation acquired Stelco for $38.50 (Canadian) in cash per share, owning more than 76 percent of Stelco's outstanding shares. Dofasco in 1999 was the most profitable steel producer in North America and in 2000 it was the most profitable in Canada. It currently has approximately 7,300 employees at its Hamilton plant and produces over four million tons of steel annually, representing about 30% of Canada's flat rolled sheet steel shipments. In addition to being one of North America's most profitable steel companies, Dofasco has been named to the Dow Jones Sustainability World Index seven years in a row. Dofasco’s wide range of steel products is sold to customers in the automotive, construction, energy, manufacturing, pipe and tube, appliance, packaging and steel distribution industries. Dofasco is currently a stand alone subsidiary of ArcelorMittal, the world's largest steel producer. Previously ordered by the U.S. Department of Justice to divest itself of the Canadian company, ArcelorMittal has now been allowed to retain Dofasco provided it sells several of its American assets instead.

National Steel Car Ltd., North America's leader in freight and passenger train cars and equipment is based in Hamilton. They have been building rail transportation products since 1912. National Steel Car recently won (January 2007) a contract for 1,200 custom-made railcars for TransLoad America, a New Jersey–based waste transport firm.

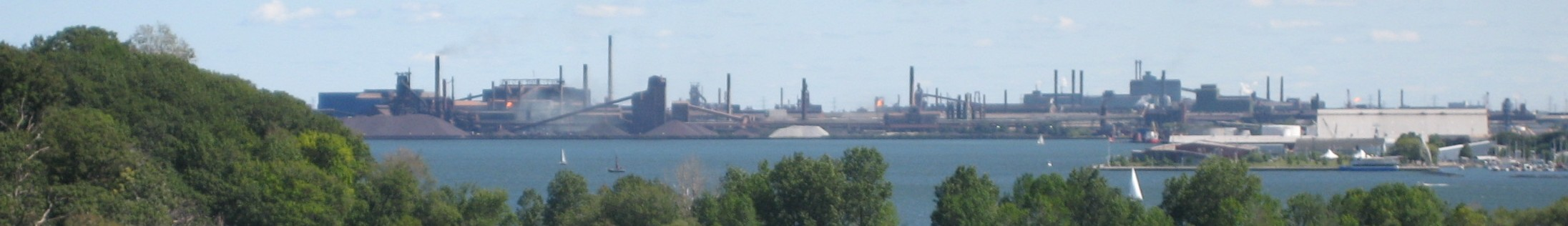
Panoramic view of Hamilton Steel mills.

=== Science and education ===
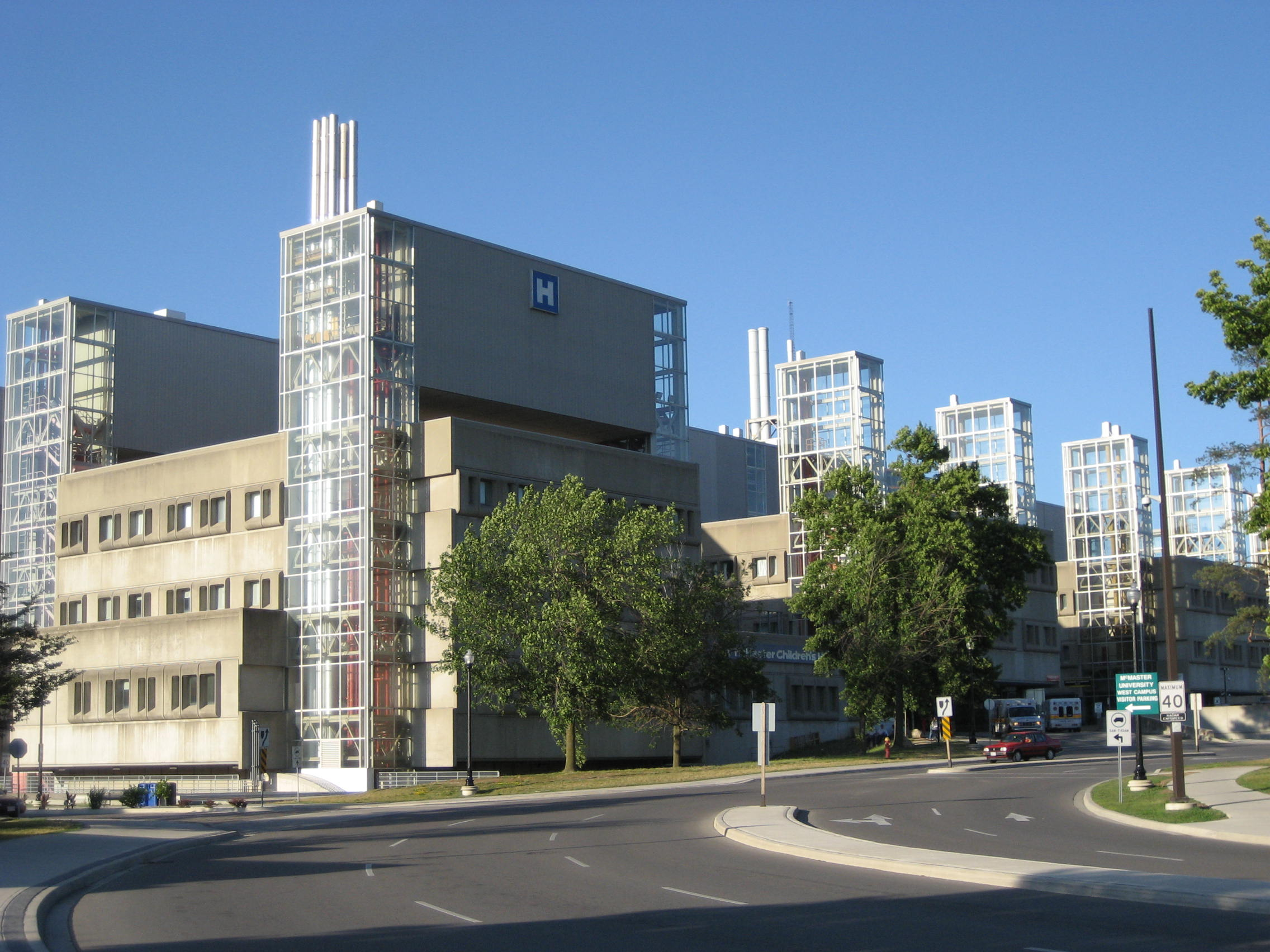
McMaster University Medical Centre

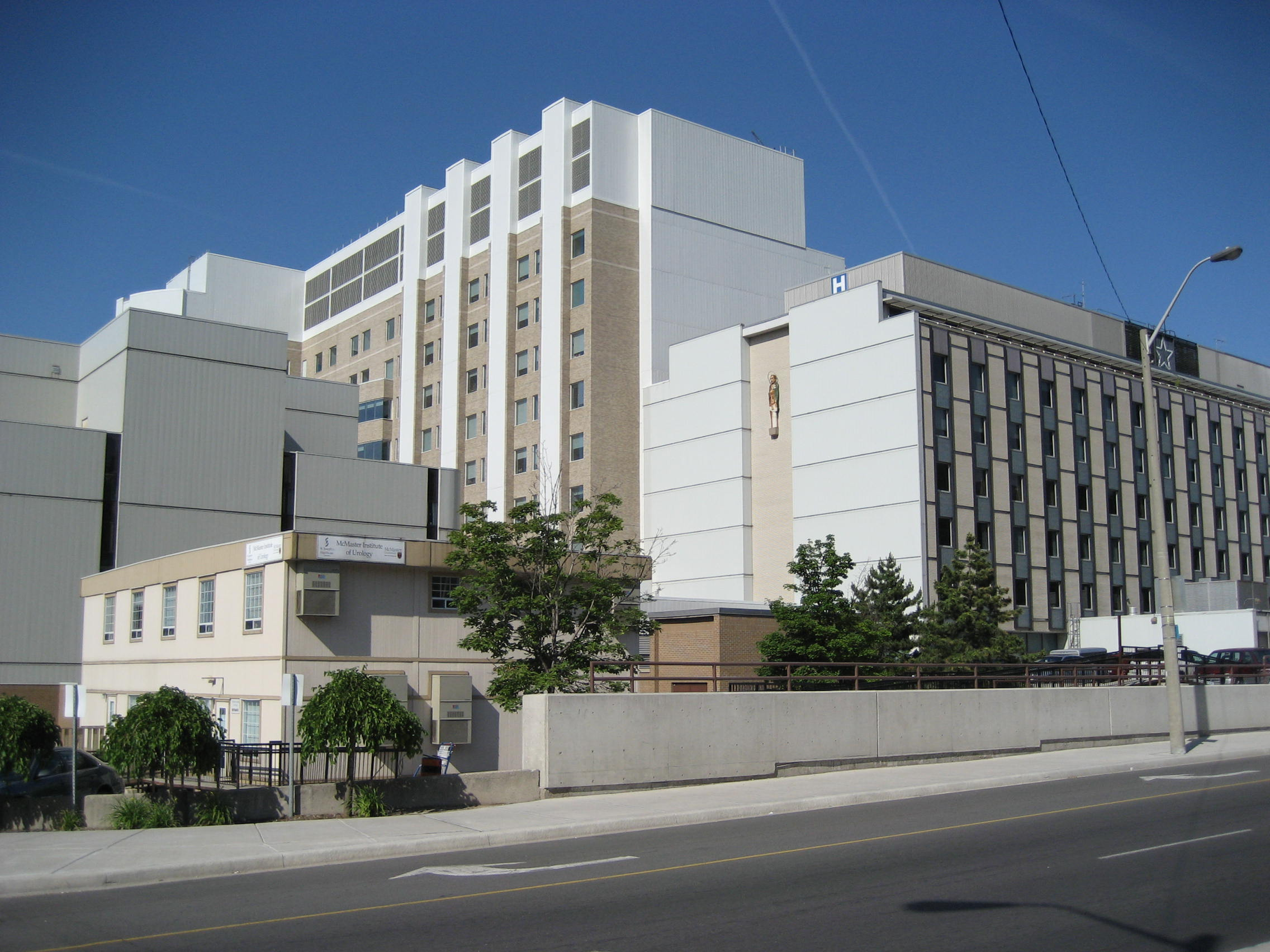
St.Joseph's Hospital, James Street South

With six hospital sites and six specialized healthcare facilities, Hamilton Health Sciences has the largest hospital-based workforce in Ontario – 15,000 staff, physicians and volunteers, serving approximately 2.2 million people in central south and central west Ontario. Hamilton Health Sciences' six unique hospitals include Hamilton General Hospital, Juravinski Hospital, McMaster Children's Hospital, McMaster University Medical Centre, St. Peter's Hospital, and West Lincoln Memorial Hospital. Hamilton Health Sciences is affiliated with McMaster University's Faculty of Health Sciences. It is one of the most comprehensive health care systems in Canada.

McMaster University was established in Hamilton in 1930. It is locally the sixth largest employer with approximately 3,500 full-time equivalent academic and support staff. It also has six partner hospitals in the city. Total student population is well over 27,000. Almost two-thirds of the students come from outside the immediate Hamilton region. McMaster's total impact on provincial GDP ($670 million in operating expenditures impacts plus $94 million in student/visitor expenditure impacts plus an estimated $525 million in technology and knowledge transfer impacts) is $1.289 billion. Capital project impacts and informal/unmeasurable knowledge transfer impacts are not included in this total, and would be in addition to the $1.289 billion estimate. A massive McMaster University research campus, McMaster Innovation Park, is being developed on the former Camco lands near Westdale. A recent $105 million CAD donation was given to McMaster's medical program from billionaire Michael G. DeGroote. It is the largest single cash gift in Canadian history and will be used to upgrade the current medical school, called the Michael G. DeGroote School of Medicine. He is also a benefactor to McMaster's business school the DeGroote School of Business.

The David Braley Cardiac, Vascular and Stroke Research Institute is a $90-million Research Centre that will be home to 500+ scientists and will be built right behind the Hamilton General Hospital. The new building with 165,000 square feet (15,300 m^{2}) is expected to open in 2010. At least 250 new jobs will be added to the local economy. David Braley contributed $10-million towards the project. Braley's donation marks an important transition in Hamilton's economy, as he takes money he made in the industrial economy and uses it to help the community develop a more diverse economic base. David Braley is the president of auto-parts manufacturer Orlick Industries Ltd., former owner of the Hamilton Tiger-Cats and current owner of the B.C. Lions. On August 19, 2008, Hamilton Health Sciences welcomed Prime Minister Stephen Harper to Hamilton General Hospital for the announcement of a $35 million grant from the Canada Foundation for Innovation. The money will support the construction of the David Braley Cardiac, Vascular & Stroke Research Institute which, when it is complete in 2009, will house two prestigious research teams—the Population Health Research Institute and the Henderson Research Centre.

=== Food and beverage industries ===
Oakrun Farm Bakery opened in 1978 in Ancaster by John & Ellie Voortman. The bakery has now grown to over 165,000 square feet (15,300 m^{2}) in size and now produces over 20 different lines and variations of other high quality products. They are a premier supplier of fresh & frozen bakery products, and are currently aggressively targeting both the United States and Canadian market. They currently produce muffins, pancakes and McGriddles for Canadian and American McDonald's outlets and bagels, cookies and tarts for Tim Hortons outlets in Canada. Their product line also includes Danish pastries, cinnamon buns, pies, cakes, crumpets and waffles. The company in January 2007 went through massive expansion to their plant and warehousing facilities in Ancaster.

Bunge is an oilseed processing plant and Canada’s largest canola processor. It has crushing facilities in Altona and Harrowby, Manitoba; Fort Saskatchewan, Alberta; and Nipawin, Saskatchewan in addition to the processing plant in Hamilton. The Hamilton plant serves food manufacturers, the biodiesel industry and farmers in Ontario & Quebec. The first Tim Hortons franchise opened in Hamilton in 1964.

=== Hamilton Port Authority ===
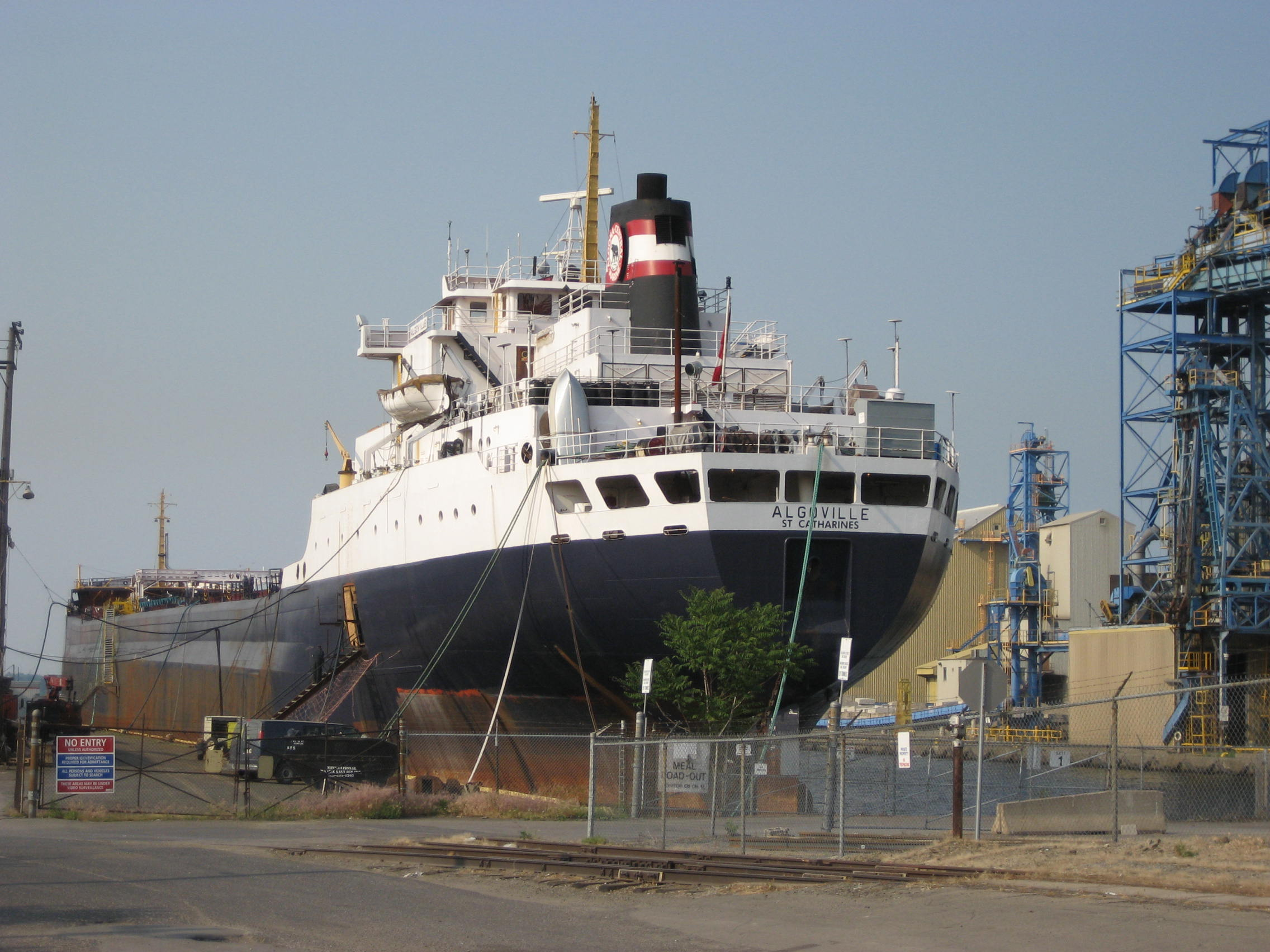
Hamilton Port Authority

The Hamilton Port Authority, formerly known as Hamilton Harbour Commission, handles over 12 million metric tonnes of cargo through over 700 vessels each year. This ranks Hamilton as the busiest of all the ports of Canada's Great Lakes and 28% of all movements on the St. Lawrence Seaway System. In 2006 Total ships in and out of the harbour was 739; Domestic/U.S.: 577 (78%), International: 162 (22%) from countries including Malaysia, Philippines, Russia and Brazil. Percentage of Imports: 87%, Percentage of Exports: 13%. International arrivals at the port grew from 130 ships in 2005 to 162 ships in 2006. In 2006 most of the materials arriving at the port include raw materials including iron ore and coal for steelmaking at Stelco and Dofasco, as well as imported steel from Brazil. The port also accepted 24,000 litres (5,280 Imp gallons) of bulk Jamaican rum. The oddest new arrival was windmill blades (some more than 80 feet (24 m) long) destined for wind farms in southern Ontario. This is the first year windmill parts have arrived in the port. Exports include 500,000 metric tonnes (550,000 short tons) of agricultural products including grain.

Hamilton Port Authority (Total Tonnage).
	2003	2004	2005	2006
OVERSEAS
Import	1,195,105	1,119,240	1,307,301	1,329,444
Export	88,860	130,208	275,074	144,956
Total	1,283,965	1,249,448	1,582,375	1,474,400
DOMESTIC & U.S.
Imports	8,860,728	9,699,948	9,606,420	9,533,026
Export	880,053	1,058,436	1,170,716	1,585,304
Total	9,740,781	10,758,384	10,777,136	11,138,330
TOTAL TONNES	11,024,746	12,007,832	12,359,511	12,612,730

=== Hamilton Airport ===
John C. Munro Hamilton International Airport is the busiest air cargo hub in the country and as well the fastest growing airport in Canada. Originally, in the 1940s the airport was used as a wartime air force training station. Today TradePort International Corporation manages and operates the John C. Munro Hamilton International Airport. Under TradePort management, passenger traffic at the Hamilton terminal has increased from 90,000 in 1996 to approx. 900,000 in 2002, and has grown dramatically since then. The airport's mid-term target for growth in its passenger service is five million air-travelers annually. Air cargo has increased by 50% since 1996; 91,000 metric tonnes (100,000 tons) of cargo passed through the airport in 2002. Hamilton's air cargo success is due to its 24-7 operational capability and strategic geographic location. Courier companies with operations at the airport include United Parcel Service and Cargojet Canada. In 2003, the city began developing a 30-year growth management strategy which called, in part, for a massive aerotropolis industrial park centred around Hamilton Airport. The aerotropolis proposal, now known as the Airport Employment Growth District, is touted as a solution to the city's shortage of employment lands. Hamilton turned over operation of the airport to TradePort International Corp. in 1996. In 2007 YVR Airport Services (YVRAS), which runs the Vancouver International Airport, took over 100 per cent ownership of TradePort in a $13-million deal. In 2008 Citigroup Inc., one of the world's largest financial institutions, invested in 50 per cent of YVRAS, the owner of TradePort, which runs Hamilton airport. The airport is also home to the Canadian Warplane Heritage Museum.

Currently the Airport needs 1,000 hectares of new employment land to handle its growth for the next 25 years; farmland around the airport is the best option available. A report by Hemson Consulting says the city will need greenfields the size of the Royal Botanical Gardens on which to locate businesses that will generate an estimated 59,000 jobs by 2031. Aerotropolis, a proposed 1,050-hectare industrial park at Highway 6 and 403, has been a hotly debated issue at City Hall for years. Opponents feel the city needs to do more investigation about the cost to taxpayers before embarking on the project. If Greater Toronto Airports Authority (GTAA) decides not to build the proposed Pickering Airport Hamilton would have a jump in passenger traffic and possibly new airlines it would be the airport to relieve strain off of Toronto Pearson which Pickering was intended for.

=== Waste management ===
On May-09-2007, Hamilton made a bid to take on Halton's trash, which includes recycling and organic material. Hamilton was the only municipality bidding for the trash. Other bids came in from the private sector. Hamilton hopes to land the contract and would be "optimizing" the use of its facilities that would bring some financial benefits to the city. Hamilton's compost facility currently handles 40,000-tons of waste per year but is capable of 80,000 to 90,000 tons.

== Economic highlights ==
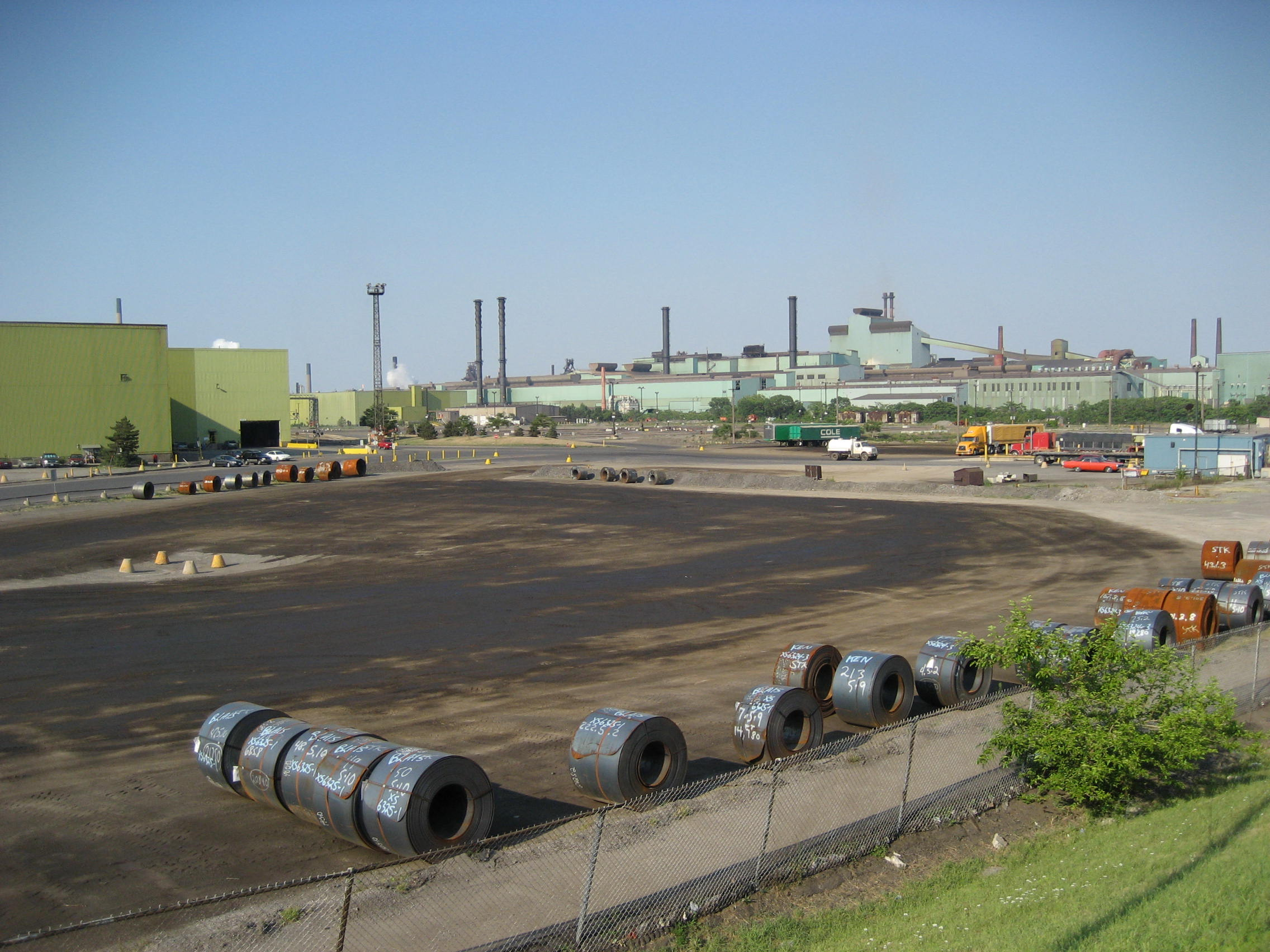
Dofasco, view from Burlington Street

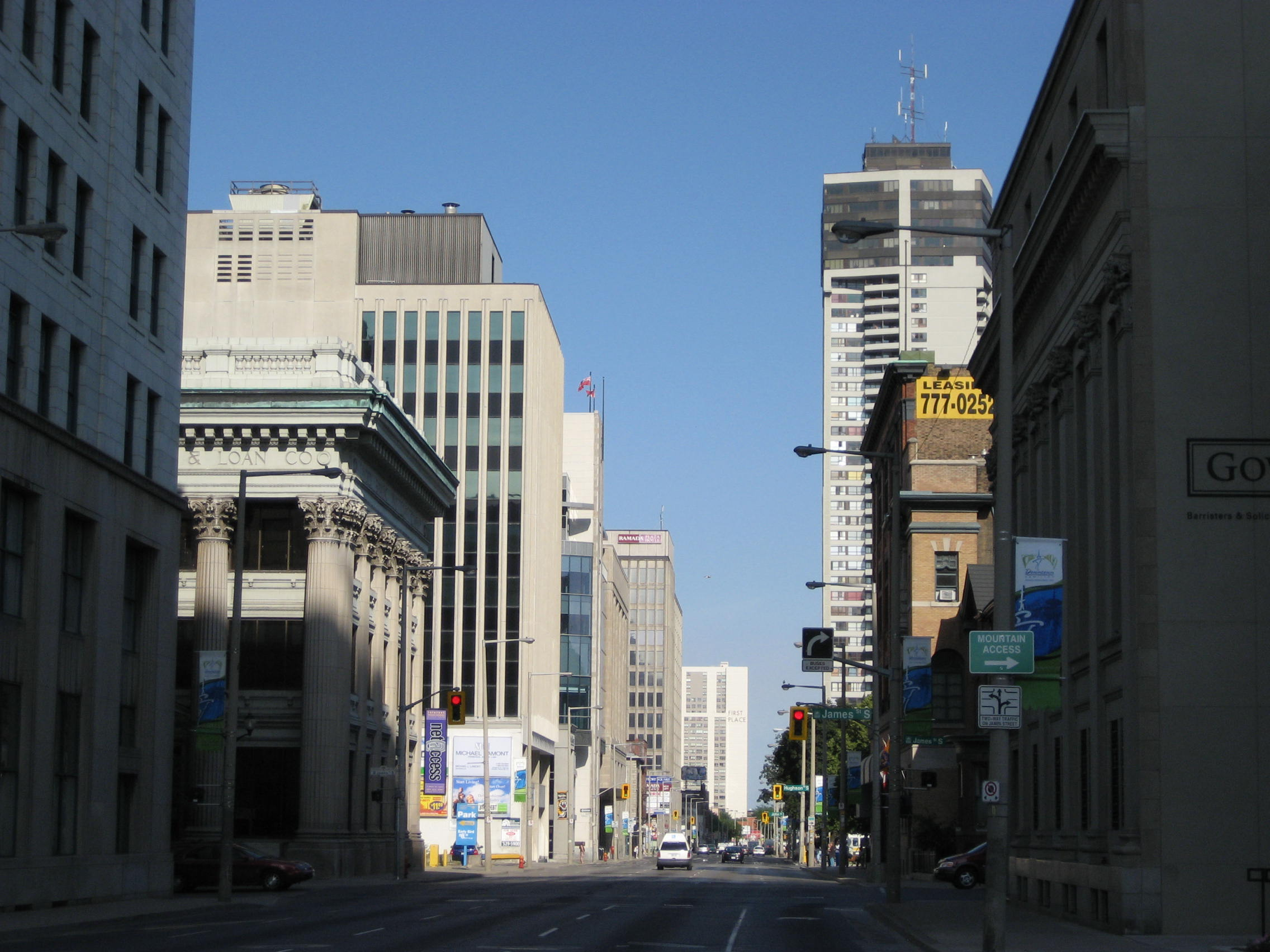
Main Street, looking East

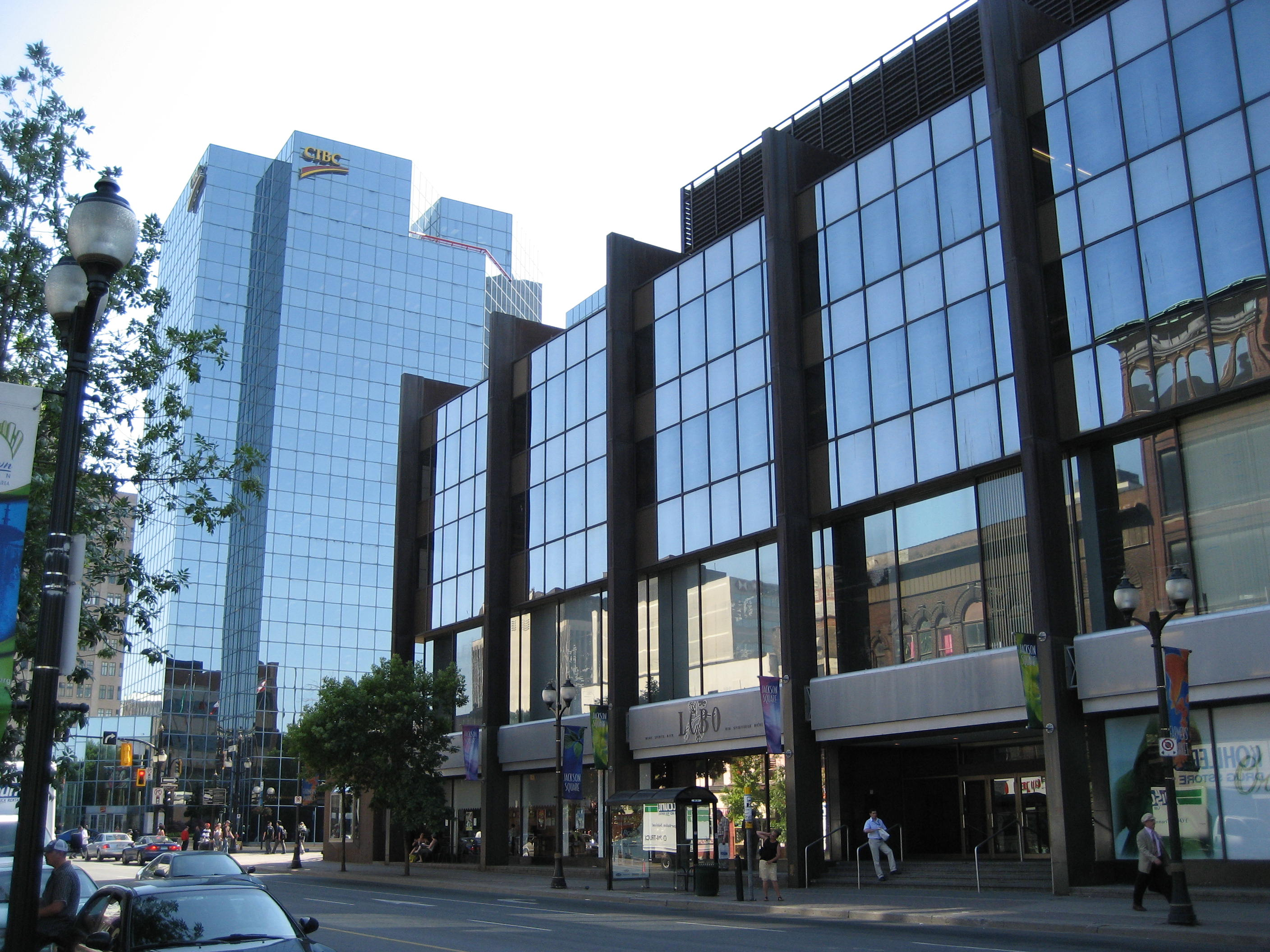
Lloyd D. Jackson Square (Mall), Commerce Place Complex

The Government of Canada published a "Labour Market Bulletin" for the Hamilton Area in 2006. The report states that Hamilton has a shortage of hotel facilities, truck drivers and finance professionals, all of which are in high demand. As well, 55% of the manufacturing workforce is expected to retire in the next 15-years and the Ontario government has injected millions of dollars into Hamilton's education sector. The steel industry also saw some highlights; Stelco emerged from bankruptcy protection and Dofasco has been taken over by Arcelor.

According to Canadian Business magazine, September 2008 edition, Hamilton ranks as the third best location in English Canada for doing business. The survey conducted by the magazine ranks cities based on the variable operating costs of doing business, cost of living, non-residential building permits, unemployment rate changes and crime rates. Hamilton was ranked seventh overall in the survey of forty cities across Canada. Only Kitchener, Ontario and Moncton, New Brunswick ranked higher in English Canada. Some of the pluses given to Hamilton include its Great Lakes port, its International Airport, the Queen Elizabeth Way from Toronto to the U.S. border, McMaster University has Canada's highest ratio of research funding to operating budget and that Hamilton is emerging as a biotech hub.

In 2006, General Electric, Vicwest Steel and Swiss-owned SFS Intec all chose to relocate to Hamilton from neighbouring G.T.A. (Greater Toronto Area). In addition, existing companies like Taylor Steel, G.T. French, Superior Boilerworks and Connon Nurseries all made major investments in their Hamilton operations.

McMaster Innovation Park, a massive McMaster University research campus, is being developed on the former Camco lands near Westdale. CANMET will employ 100 research scientists and support workers and will be the anchor tenant of the facility. They will be working closely with McMaster researchers and private industry to develop technologies for metal and materials manufacturing, processing and evaluation. Expected to be up-and-running by 2010. Other tenants already announced for the park include a corrosion research centre sponsored by General Motors and a diesel engine research lab sponsored by Ford.

On September 27, 2007, Centre Mall owners announce plans for a 23-building super centre on the property on Barton Street East. Cost is estimated to be around $100-million and will take up 700,000 square feet (65,000 m^{2}) of retail space. This will end up being the largest redevelopment project in the history of Hamilton's east-end. The buildings on the property will be grouped around the edge of the property and create a friendly, pedestrian-oriented design rather than a commercial island in a sea of parking. One week later, on October 4, 2007, it is announced that the Mountain Plaza Mall at Fennell Avenue and Upper James Street is to be rebuilt in a $50-million project. Announcement made by Flavio Volpe, spokesperson for Smart Centres Ltd., Vaughan, Ontario-based company that bought the Mall in November 2006.

A four-lane parkway called Red Hill Valley Parkway (or popularly, the Red Hill Creek Expressway), a municipal expressway running through the city to connect the Lincoln M. Alexander Parkway to the Queen Elizabeth Way near Hamilton Harbour, was completed in 2007. The parkway was originally scheduled to be opened to vehicular traffic on November 16 but the date was pushed back a day and officially opened November 17. 2007.

== Shopping malls ==
- Battlefield Square
- Centre Mall (now called Centre on Barton)
- Eastgate Square
- Effort Square
- Fennell Square
- Fiesta Mall
- Gulliver Square
- Lloyd D. Jackson Square
- Hamilton City Centre (formerly the Eaton's Centre)
- Heritage Green Shopping Center
- Lime Ridge Mall
- Meadowlands Centre
- Mountain Plaza Mall
- South Hamilton Square
- Spartan Square
- Taba Development (Upper Ottawa)
- University Plaza
- Village Plaza
- Waterdown Shopping Centre
- Westcliffe Mall

== See also ==
- Economic history of Hamilton, Ontario
- List of films shot in Hamilton, Ontario
