= Hamilton General Hospital =

- Hamilton Health Sciences
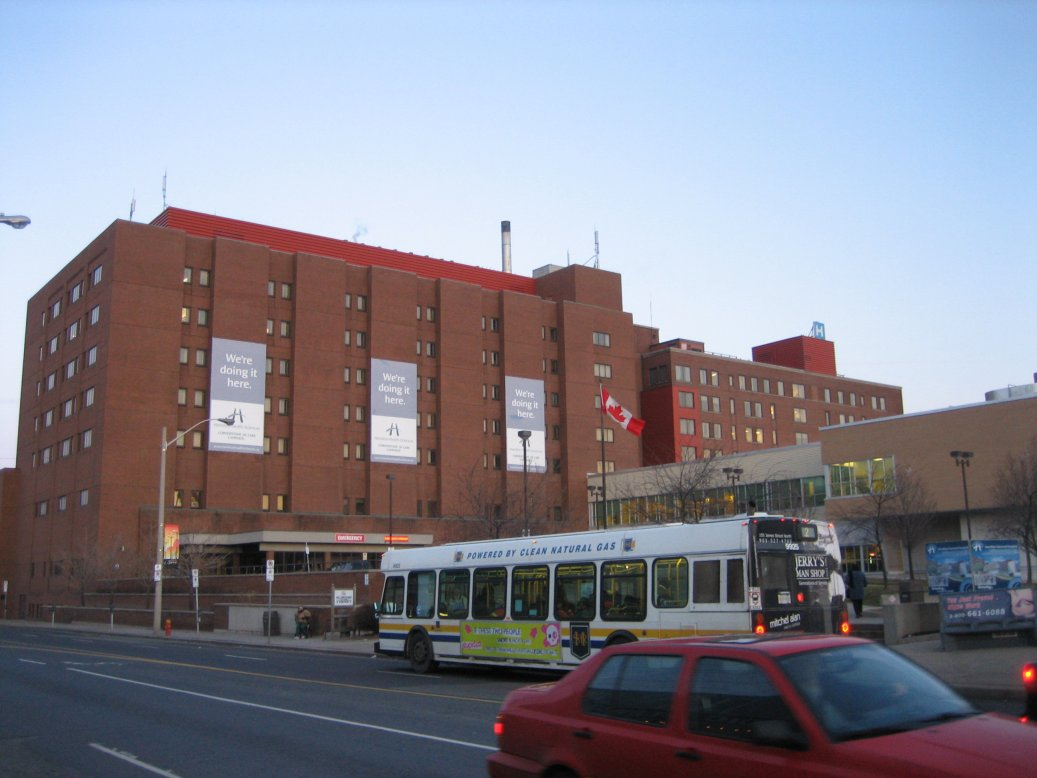
- Hamilton General Hospital

- Location in Ontario

Geography
- Location: 237 Barton St E, Hamilton, Ontario, Canada
- Coordinates: 43.261944°N 79.854722°W

Organization
- Care system: Medicare (Ontario Health Insurance Plan)
- Type: Teaching, specialist
- Affiliated university: Michael G. DeGroote School of Medicine (McMaster University)

Services
- Emergency department: Level I Trauma Centre
- Beds: 1273 (acute care)

Helipads
- Helipad: TC LID: CPK3

History
- Founded: 1848

Links
- Website: hhsc.ca
- Lists: Hospitals in Canada

The Hamilton General Hospital (HGH) is a major teaching hospital in Downtown Hamilton, Ontario, Canada, located at the intersection of Barton Street East and Victoria Avenue North. It is operated by Hamilton Health Sciences and is formally affiliated with the Michael G. DeGroote School of Medicine at McMaster University. HGH is Canada's largest hospital by bed count.

HGH has a high acute and emergency care burden, as 53.7% of patients are admitted through the emergency department (2020-2021). In 2020-2021, the average length of stay was 7.6 days and number of acute admissions was 45,165.

HGH is one of the largest cardiac surgical centres in Canada, performing over 1,600 open heart surgeries annually. The hospital generated CA$182,000,000 of research income in 2013, second to the University Health Network amongst research hospitals in Canada, and representing 14.8% of its income.

HGH is also one of the largest trauma, neurosurgery, and stroke centres in Canada. They perform over 1700 neurosurgical procedures annually. It is an accredited centre of Distinction in Stroke Services for demonstrating clinical excellence in Acute Stroke Services and Inpatient Stroke Rehabilitation Services.

== History ==
Founded in 1848, the hospital became a part of Hamilton Health Sciences in 1996 when Hamilton General, Henderson General, McMaster University Medical Centre, McMaster Children's Hospital and Chedoke Hospital merged. This union formed one of the largest teaching hospitals in Ontario, operating across four sites with approximately 8,000 employees and 1,000 physicians. Other hospitals soon followed.

== Facilities ==
The hospital is equipped with a rooftop helipad (TC LID: CPK3). Hamilton General Hospital is a regional centre specializing in cardiac and vascular care, neuroscience, trauma and burn treatment, stroke and rehabilitation. It is home to the state-of-the-art Dofasco Heart Investigation Unit; one of the province’s few rooftop heliports; a Level 1 trauma centre and the second busiest burn unit in Ontario. Also located at the General site are the Regional Rehabilitation Centre and the David Braley Cardiac, Vascular and Stroke Research Institute.

The David Braley Cardiac, Vascular and Stroke Research Institute is a research centre located behind the Hamilton General Hospital. It is home to more than 400 staff and researchers. The new building with 200,000 square feet (19,000 m^{2}) opened 11 March 2010. At least 250 new jobs will be added to the local economy. David Braley, for whom the institute is named, contributed $10 million towards the project.
