= Charles Juravinski =

Canadian businessman and philanthropist (1929–2022)

- Born: Orest Juravinski; November 1, 1929; Blaine Lake, Saskatchewan, Canada
- Died: February 15, 2022 (aged 92); Dundas, Ontario, Canada
- Occupations: Businessman; philanthropist
- Known for: Flamboro Downs racetrack
- Spouse: Margaret Juravinski (m. 1956)

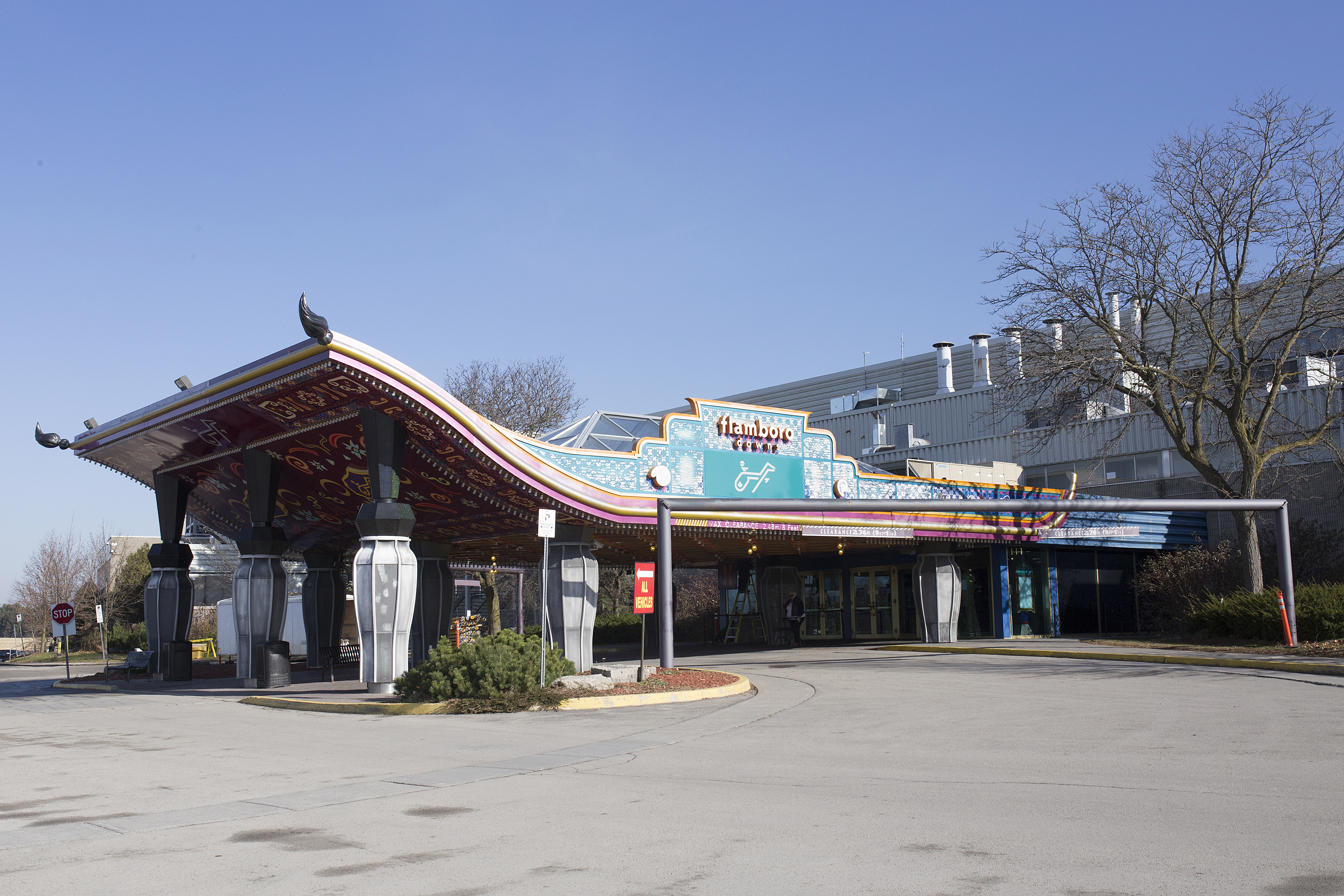
Entrance to Flamboro Downs Racetrack and Casino, located near Hamilton, Ontario.

Orest "Charles" Juravinski (Polish pronunciation zhuravinski) (November 1, 1929 – February 15, 2022) was a Canadian businessman and philanthropist. He was principally known as the founder and owner of the Flamboro Downs racetrack and the co-benefactor, along with his wife Margaret, of the Juravinski Hospital and Juravinski Cancer Centre in Hamilton, Ontario.

== Early life ==
Juravinski was born Orest Juravinski in Blaine Lake, Saskatchewan, on November 1, 1929. He was the youngest of four sons born to Irene and Nick Juravinski, who ran the only pool room in Blaine Lake until the Great Depression. His family eventually relocated to Hamilton, Ontario, during his childhood, motivated by job opportunities arising from wartime industry. He polished shoes at a barbershop on Barton Street and delivered newspapers during his adolescence. Juravinski attended Cathedral High School, but he ultimately dropped out when he was sixteen. He then found employment in factories and as a mortar mixer for a bricklayer. He later ran an Esso gas station when he was 23 years old.

== Career ==
After saving up money from his Esso service, Juravinski was employed by Piggott Construction. He also took classes in blueprint reading to make himself accustomed to the industry. One of his classmates, Bill McCann, teamed up with Juravinski to establish Wilchar Construction in 1958. They operated the company until McCann retired in 1971.

Juravinski subsequently ran for the provincial Progressive Conservative nomination after Ray Connell, a Member of Provincial Parliament (MPP) in Hamilton, decided not to seek another term. However, he was unsuccessful and went into horse racing on the advice of Connell.

Although he was counselled to construct a racetrack at the Ancaster fairgrounds, Juravinski opted to build a track from scratch in nearby Flamborough, Ontario. He partnered with trucking magnate John Grant for the project, which cost C$5 million. Flamboro Downs opened on April 9, 1975, with 6,000 people in attendance.

Despite having to compete with five established tracks situated within an hour of Hamilton, Flamboro Downs proved very successful and hosted the Confederation Cup Pace. Juravinski ultimately bought out Grant's stake in the racetrack, and he managed it with his wife Margaret. They were initially going to sell the track for $62 million to the Ontario Jockey Club, which signed a letter of intent in 2000. However, the deal failed and they eventually sold Flamboro Downs to Magna Entertainment in June 2002 for $72 million and retired.

Half a year into retirement, Juravinski and his wife began making considerable donations to the City of Hamilton and McMaster University, focusing on cancer and health care. This permitted the establishment of a new state-of-the-art cancer care facility at the former Henderson Hospital, now renamed the Juravinski Hospital. At first, the couple were reluctant to have the facility named after them, but they ultimately acquiesced.

They later gave an endowment of $100 million in 2019 that led to the establishment of the Juravinski Research Institute (JRI), a partnership between McMaster, Hamilton Health Sciences and St. Joseph's Healthcare Hamilton. This was one of the largest legacy gifts made in Canada. They made their last donation together of $5.1 million to the JRI – to finance studies focused on child and youth health, integrated care and burn trauma – on Valentine's Day 2022, a day before his death.

== Personal life and death ==
Juravinski married Margaret at the Holy Spirit Ukrainian Byzantine Catholic Church in 1956. They had met after being introduced by McCann (who was dating Margaret's sister Kate), and they remained married for 66 years until his death. They did not have children.

Juravinski died in his sleep on February 15, 2022, at Margaret’s Place, a hospice that his wife and he had helped build in Dundas, Ontario. He was 92, and he had suffered from declining mobility and sight prior to his death. His widow, Margaret, died on May 9, 2023, at the age of 91.
