= Melanie Marden =

Canadian actress, model and producer (born 1975)

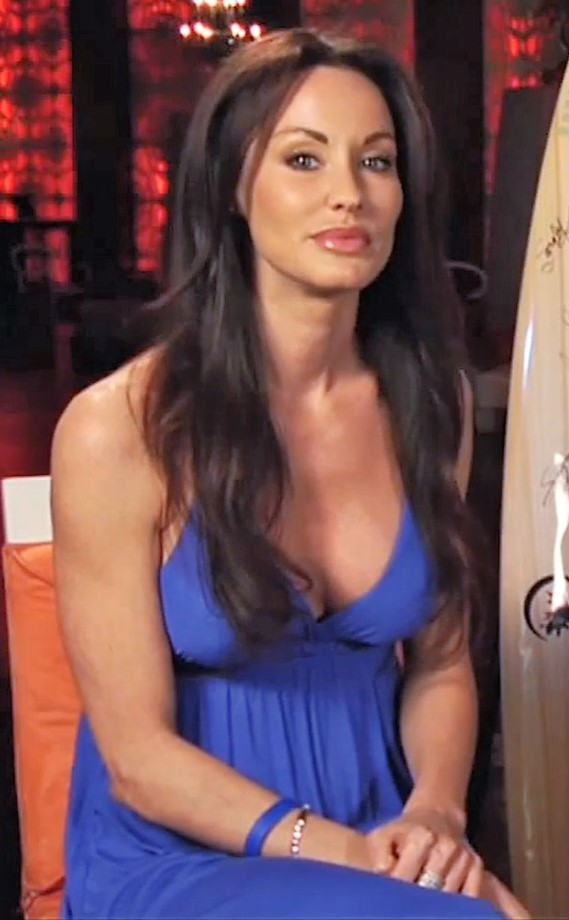
- Marden interviewed in 2012
- Born: 1975 (age 49–50); Toronto, Ontario, Canada
- Occupation(s): Actress, model, producer
- Years active: 2002–present
- Height: 5 ft 7 in (170 cm)

Melanie J Marden (born 1975) is a Canadian actress, model and producer known for starring in the movie Pigs (2007) and the reality TV series Friends to Lovers?. In 2018, she appeared in rapper T.I.'s music video for "Dime Trap" as First Lady Melania Trump. The provocative nature of the music video sparked outrage, especially among Trump supporters.

== Early life ==
Marden was born in Toronto, Ontario. She lost her mother to brain cancer in 2009.

== Career ==
In 2007, Marden starred as Gabrielle in the teen comedy film Pigs. In 2010, she produced and starred in the short film Timeless, which is based on the true story of her mother who died of brain cancer.

She was also on the cover of Maxim Italy's March edition in 2014.

Marden gained prominence for her role in the Friends to Lovers?, a Bravo reality series where she appeared alongside her longtime friend Greg Plitt. The series only aired for one season following Plitt's death.

In 2018, Marden appeared as a naked Melania Trump in the music video for T.I.'s "Dime Trap". Following her appearance, she received a series of death threats, one of which detailed the presence of hired assassins. She responded with a video citing Ms. Trump's anti-cyberbullying campaign, Be Best.

== Personal life ==
Marden was married to Craig Fury in 2008 and they were divorced in 2011. She was close friends with Greg Plitt; some reports following his 2015 death referenced her as his girlfriend.

== Filmography ==
=== Film ===
Year	Title	Role	Notes	Ref.
2007	Final Draft	November		
2007	Pigs	Gabrielle 'X'		
2011	Timeless	Herself		
2012	Mafia	Farrah		
2014	Mr. Murphy	Amy		
2015	The Last Girl	Lauren		
2015	Body High	Stacy		
2017	Hard Visit	Victoria Daniels	completed	
2020	Reboot Camp	Tiffany	post-production	
N/A	Red to Black	Marissa Childs	post-production	
N/A	Bad President	Melania Trump	post-production	

=== Television ===
Year	Title	Role	Notes	Ref.
2002	Mutant X	Valerie	Episode: 'Past as Prologue'	
2004	Hustle	Annie #1	TV movie	
2014	LA Live the Show	Host	3 episodes	
2014-2015	Friends to Lovers?	Herself	5 episodes	
