= Juravinski Cancer Centre =

- Hamilton Health Sciences

Geography
- Location: 699 Concession Street; Hamilton, Ontario, Canada; L8V 5C2
- Coordinates: 43°14′25″N 79°50′47″W

Organisation
- Affiliated university: Michael G. DeGroote School of Medicine
- Network: Hamilton Health Sciences

Services
- Emergency department: No
- Beds: 125

History
- Founded: 1992

Links
- Website: http://jcc.hhsc.ca/

The Juravinski Cancer Centre (JCC) is a comprehensive centre for cancer care and cancer research in Hamilton, Ontario, Canada. Operated by Hamilton Health Sciences, it is adjacent to the Juravinski Hospital, which provides emergency department facilities. The hospital was recently ranked 2nd in Canada for research according to Research Infosource Inc.

Juravinski Hospital and Juravinski Cancer Centre compose a full-service general hospital offering cancer care and orthopedics. The combination of inpatient and outpatient programs supports one of the largest comprehensive cancer centres in Canada, including community-based oncology clinics in Brantford and Burlington. The site's programs range from prevention, screening, and diagnosis to treatment including chemotherapy and the region's only radiation therapy program. The latter makes JCC a tertiary care centre for Ontario. The hospital is a teaching hospital for the Michael G. DeGroote School of Medicine at McMaster University.

== History ==
The site was redeveloped in 2010 and renamed Juravinski Hospital for Charles Juravinski, former owner of the Flamboro Downs racetrack. He donated $43-million to Hamilton city hospitals along with his wife Margaret.

== Fundraising ==
The Hamilton Health Sciences Foundation raises funds to support the Juravinski Hospital and Cancer Centre including: capital projects, equipment, research, fellowship, education, hospital programs and patient amenities.

== See also ==
- Cancer Care Ontario
