= Final Draft (2007 film) =

Final Draft (2007)
- Directed by: Jonathan Dueck
- Written by: Darryn Lucio
- Produced by: Patrick Cameron; Harvey Glazer; Kate Harrison; Robert Wilson
- Starring: James Van Der Beek; Darryn Lucio; Tara Spencer-Nairn; Jeff Roop; Melanie Marden; Adam MacDonald; Devon Ferguson
- Cinematography: Mick Reynolds
- Edited by: Geoff Ashenhurst
- Music by: Ryan Latham
- Production company: 235 Films
- Distributed by: Peace Arch Films
- Release date: September 18, 2007 (United States)
- Running time: 89 minutes
- Country: United States
- Language: English

Final Draft is a 2007 American horror film directed by Jonathan Dueck, produced by 235 Films and distributed by Peace Arch Films. The film was released theatrically in the United States on September 18, 2007.

== Plot ==
Paul (James Van Der Beek) is an aspiring script writer with a big problem; he only has 18 days to release his last script, a script that could be his chance to be someone. He decides to lock his home and live in isolation until the job is done. But the main character of his story is a maniac clown, and the line between fantasy and reality is so thin, which makes Paul turn crazy.

== Cast ==
- James Van Der Beek as Paul Twist
- Tara Spencer-Nairn as Kate Twist
- Melanie Marden
- Darryn Lucio
- Jeff Roop as Michael
- Devon Ferguson

== Release ==
Final Draft was released on DVD by Peace Arch Entertainment on September 18, 2007.

== Critical reception ==
DVD Talk gave the film a negative review, calling it "overly simplistic". Nick Perkins, of Collider, found the film "surprisingly compelling".
