= Friends to Lovers? =

- Genre: Reality television
- Country of origin: United States
- Original language: English
- No. of seasons: 1
- No. of episodes: 8

Production
- Executive producers: Fenton Bailey; Randy Barbato; Tom Campbell; Angela Rae Berg
- Camera setup: Multiple
- Running time: 42 minutes
- Production company: World of Wonder

Original release
- Network: Bravo
- Release: January 12 – February 23, 2015

Friends to Lovers? is an American reality television series that premiered on January 12, 2015, on Bravo. Announced in January 2014, the hour-long series features a few couples of friends who are eager to "leave the comfort of the 'friend zone' behind" and try to develop their friendship into exclusive romantic relationships.

"'Friends to Lovers?' is a guaranteed roller coaster ride that will make you cringe from awkwardness one second while having you believe in true love the next," said Lara Spotts, Vice President of Development of the network. "With real stakes, drama, and romance, these couples' journeys will continue to keep our savvy viewers engaged and guessing whether these twosomes are meant to be lovers or to remain just friends," she also added.

== Contestants ==
- Marshana Ritchie – Marshana Ritchie is a Brooklyn, New York-based make-up artists and beauty blogger.
- Kristen Ruby – Kris Ruby is an American entrepreneur, TV commentator and pundit.
- Jin Mosely – Jin Mosley is a single mother of four and ex-wife to professional boxer Shane Mosely.
- Darion Lowenstein – Darion Lowenstein is a video game developer who worked for companies like Electronic Arts.
- Charley Walters – Charley Walters is the Founder and CEO of CW3 Public Relations and regularly works with high–profile clients.
- Melanie Marden – Melanie Marden is a beauty industry entrepreneur
- Sydney Hall – Sydney Hall is a nightlife entrepreneur in Hollywood, California.
- Greg Plitt – Greg Plitt is a former Army Ranger and fitness model killed at 37 when hit by a train. His death only two weeks after the premiere of the first season cut the show's filming short.
- Alex Goldman – Alex Goldman is an executive chef and a catering company owner in New York.
- Stefan Lienhard – Stefan Lienhard is a military veteran and Long Island police officer.

== Reception ==
Brian Lowry wrote a mild review for Variety by saying, "Too many reality shows have the chutzpah to refer to themselves as “experiments,” but the issues broached by Friends to Lovers? might qualify as one [...] if only the program could break out, just a little, from its too–familiar approach." Ray Rahman from Entertainment Weekly said, "Too many of the cast members are insufferable to the point of undateable... But there are some bright spots".
