= Christmas Around the Corner =

- Genre: Romance, Christmas
- Written by: Michael Murray
- Directed by: Megan Follows
- Starring: Alexandra Breckenridge; Jamie Spilchuk
- Country of origin: United States
- Original language: English

Production
- Producer: Danielle Von Zerneck

Original release
- Network: Lifetime
- Release: 2018

Christmas Around the Corner is a 2018 Lifetime Christmas television movie starring Alexandra Breckenridge and Jamie Spilchuk.

== Plot ==
Claire, a venture capitalist from New York City, travels to a small Vermont town for the holidays to revitalize the Fortenbury Bookstore. The bookstore's owner, Andrew, initially clashes with Claire over the improvements yet they soon begin a budding romance.

== Cast ==
- Alexandra Breckenridge as Claire
- Jamie Spilchuk as Andrew
- Jane Alexander as Mrs. Tumilty
- Tara Spencer-Nairn as Suzanne
- Maya Harris-Harb as Alicia Soto
- Paulyne Wei as Barb Nadler

== Critical reception ==
J!-Ent, "An entertaining holiday film. "Christmas Around the Corner" is a holiday film with positive vibes and worth checking out!"

Lifetime Uncorked, a wine themed Lifetime review website, awarded the film three Christmas trees and three glasses of wine required.
