= Film industry in Hamilton, Ontario =

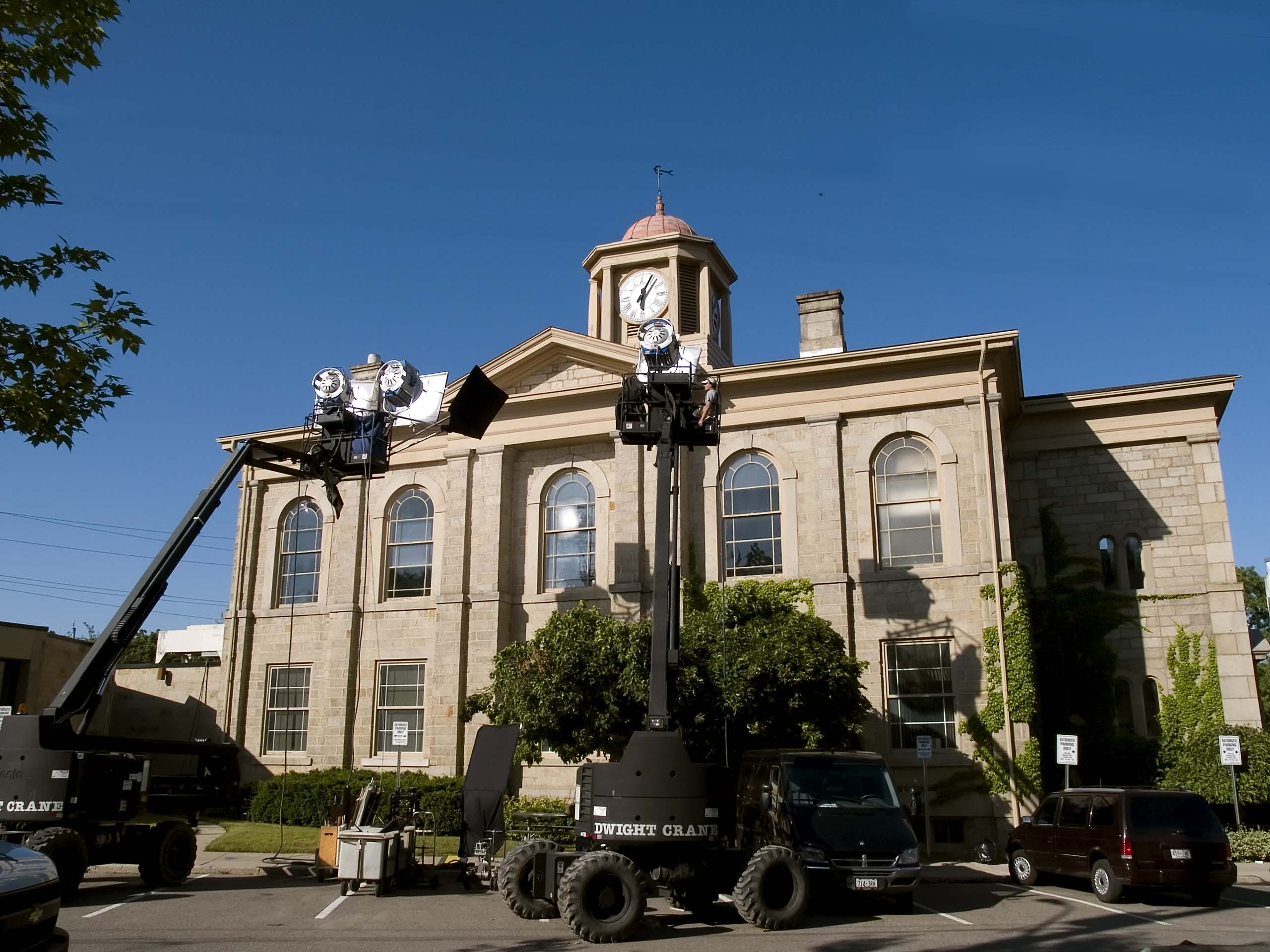
Film production in Dundas Town Hall

Hamilton, Ontario, Canada, has become a popular destination for the television and film industry, attracting dozens of film and television productions each year.

Many prominent actors have worked on productions filmed in Hamilton, and the city has positioned itself to attract new productions with a regional tax incentive.

In 2007 the city launched an ad campaign to lure in film studios.

Hamilton has a dedicated office geared towards assisting those in the film and music industry.

== Local participation in film industry ==
Julia Arthur

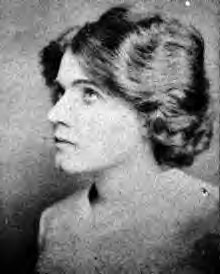
Florence Lawrence, "Hollywood's first movie star."

Local TV station CHCH introduced Canadians to Smith & Smith, which featured Steve and Morag Smith (the former better known from his stint as Red Green). The Hilarious House of Frightenstein was a Canadian children's television series which was also produced by CHCH in 1971. It was syndicated to television stations across Canada and the United States, and occasionally still appears today in some TV markets. The show's cast included Billy Van, Fishka Rais, Guy Big, Mitch Markowitz, Vincent Price, and Julius Sumner Miller. One hundred and thirty episodes of the series were made in a nine-month span starting in 1971.

Don Cherry's Grapevine began airing on CHCH TV in the 1980s and shot on location at CHCH TV's Telecentre on King Street West and then at CHCH's main studio on Jackson Street West. The production then moved (including the original set and bar) to the restaurant Cherry had in town, also called "Don Cherry's Grapevine". The restaurant was on Main Street East. CHCH also produced local broadcasts such as Tiny Talent Time and Party Game.

Power Play was a Canadian television drama series that aired on CTV from 1998 to 2000. The show starred Michael Riley as Brett Parker, a former New York City sports agent who became the general manager of a (fictional) National Hockey League franchise, the Hamilton Steelheads.

A number of Hamiltonians played a part in the early development of Hollywood, including Jean Adair (1873–1953), Julia Arthur (1868–1959), Douglass Dumbrille (1889–1974), and Florence Lawrence (1890–1938) who was a silent film actress and often referred to as "Hollywood's First Movie Star". She was also known as "The Biograph Girl" and "The Girl of a Thousand Faces". During her lifetime, Lawrence appeared in more than 270 films for various motion picture companies.

Del Lord (Grimsby, Ontario) was an early Hollywood film director and actor, best known as a director of Three Stooges films. Interested in the theatre, he travelled to New York City; when fellow Canadian Mack Sennett offered him a job at his new Keystone Studios, Lord went on to work in Hollywood, California. There he played the driver of the Keystone Cops police van, appearing in several of the successful films.

Modern-day contributions to Hollywood by Hamiltonians include SCTV alumni Eugene Levy, Martin Short, and Dave Thomas. All three attended McMaster University along with John Candy in the 1970s. Others include Kathleen Robertson, best known for her work on 90210(1994–1997) and 2002 crime film Torso: The Evelyn Dick Story and Stana Katic best known for her role as Detective Kate Beckett on ABC's Castle.

Well-known movie directors and producers in Hollywood from Hamilton are Daniel Goldberg (Space Jam, Twins) and Slovakian-born, Canadian-raised Ivan Reitman. Reitman is most remembered for directing and producing a string of comedies, mostly in the 1980s and 1990s (Meatballs, Stripes and Ghostbusters). Reitman is also a founder of the McMaster Film Board at McMaster University. Reitman and Goldberg have worked together in the past on a number of film productions and continue to work together today as partners in the production company Northern Lights Entertainment.

== Production locations ==
Locations across Hamilton have been featured prominently in a number of major film productions. Hamilton is often used as a stand-in for other, more recognizable cities.

Some of these filming locations include:

- Copps Coliseum, featured in Detroit Rock City (1999) Against the Ropes (2004)
- LIUNA Station, featured in The Long Kiss Goodnight (1996), and X-Men (2000)
- Cathedral High School, featured in Finding Forrester (2000)
- Downtown Hamilton, featured in Exit Wounds. The six-week shoot drew large crowds and featured the Gore Park water fountain and the Hamilton GO Transit station. The location was also used for Man of the Year (2006).
- Hamilton Cemetery, featured in Resident Evil: Apocalypse (2004)
- North End neighborhoods, near Stelco and Dofasco's steel mills, featured in Four Brothers (2005)
- Hamilton Harbour, featured in Cinderella Man (2005)
- The old Westinghouse headquarters building, featured in Firehouse Dog (2006)
- Main Street East, featured in The Incredible Hulk (2007). Crews erected temporary buildings behind the Royal Connaught Hotel. The streets of Hamilton were made to look like Harlem, New York.

=== Dundas, Ontario ===
The DeLuxe Restaurant was a nostalgic 1950s-style diner found on King Street (Dundas), used primarily for film shoots. A number of feature films and television productions have been shot in Dundas. They include:

- Man of the Year
- West Wing
- Molly: An American Girl on the Home Front
- Closing the Ring
- Good Witch

After years of sitting closed and serving the film industry on occasion, the DeLuxe Restaurant underwent extensive renovations and opened as Thai restaurant Bangkok Spoon in 2009.

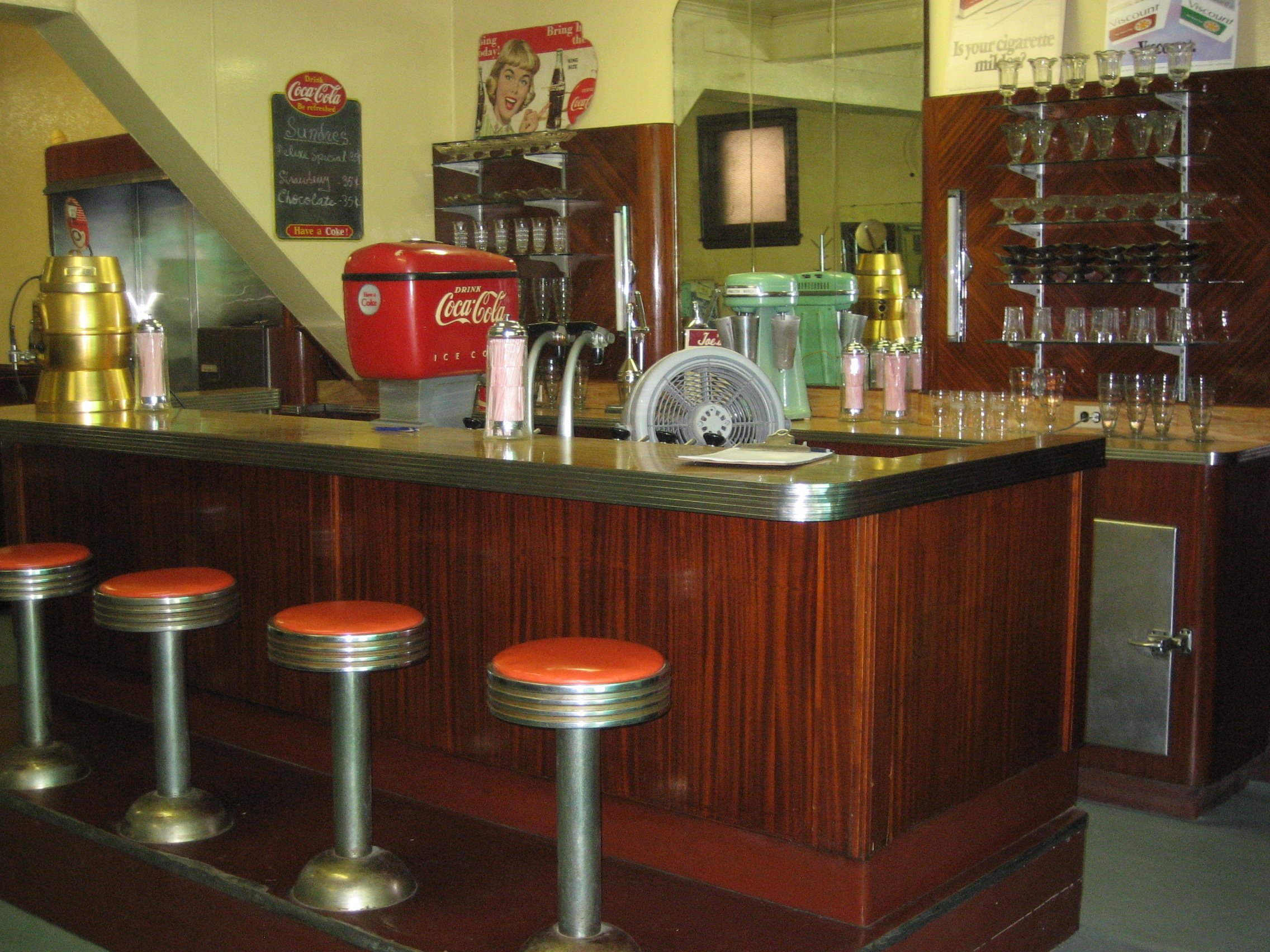
De Luxe Restaurant

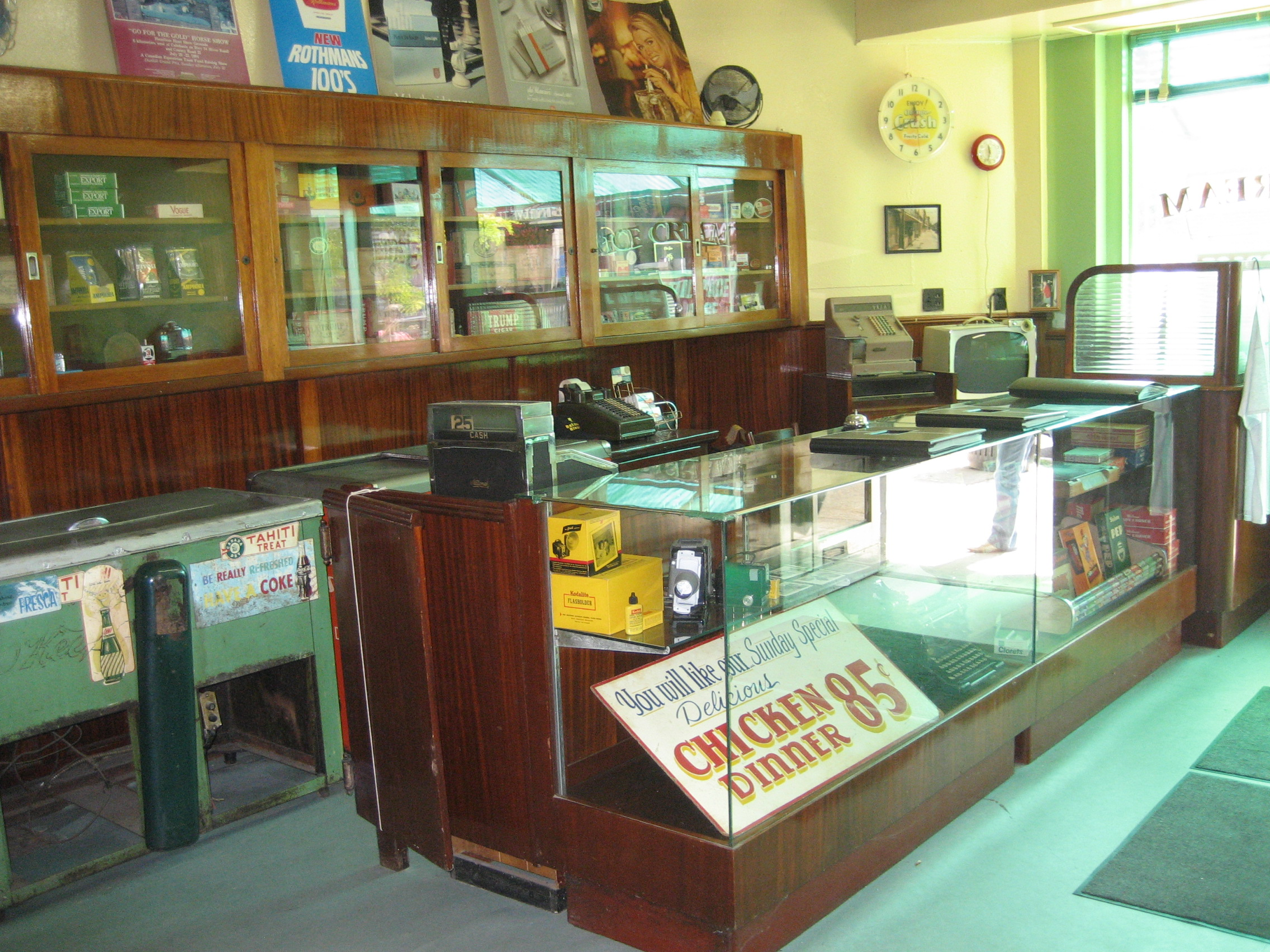
De Luxe Restaurant

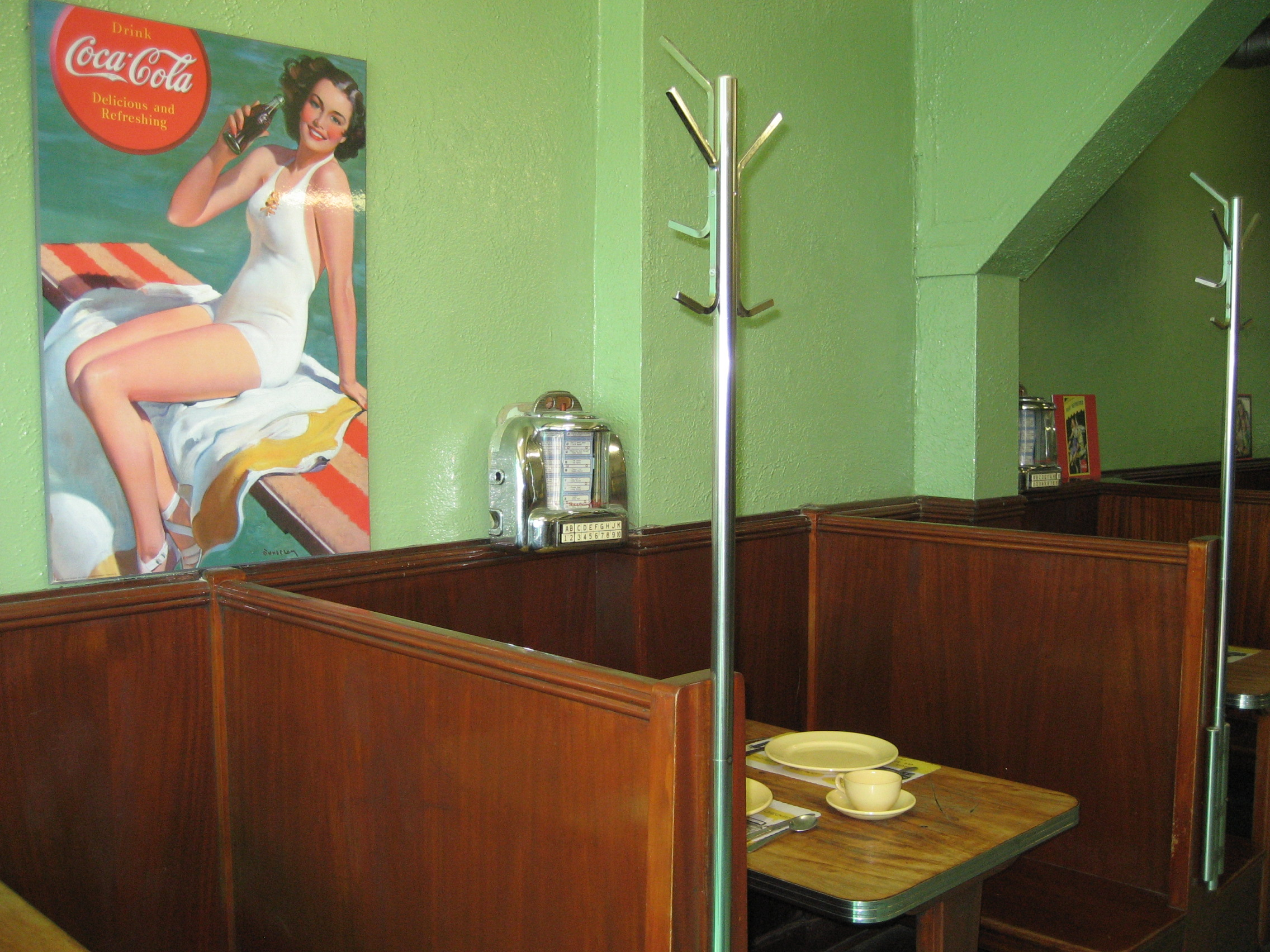
De Luxe Restaurant

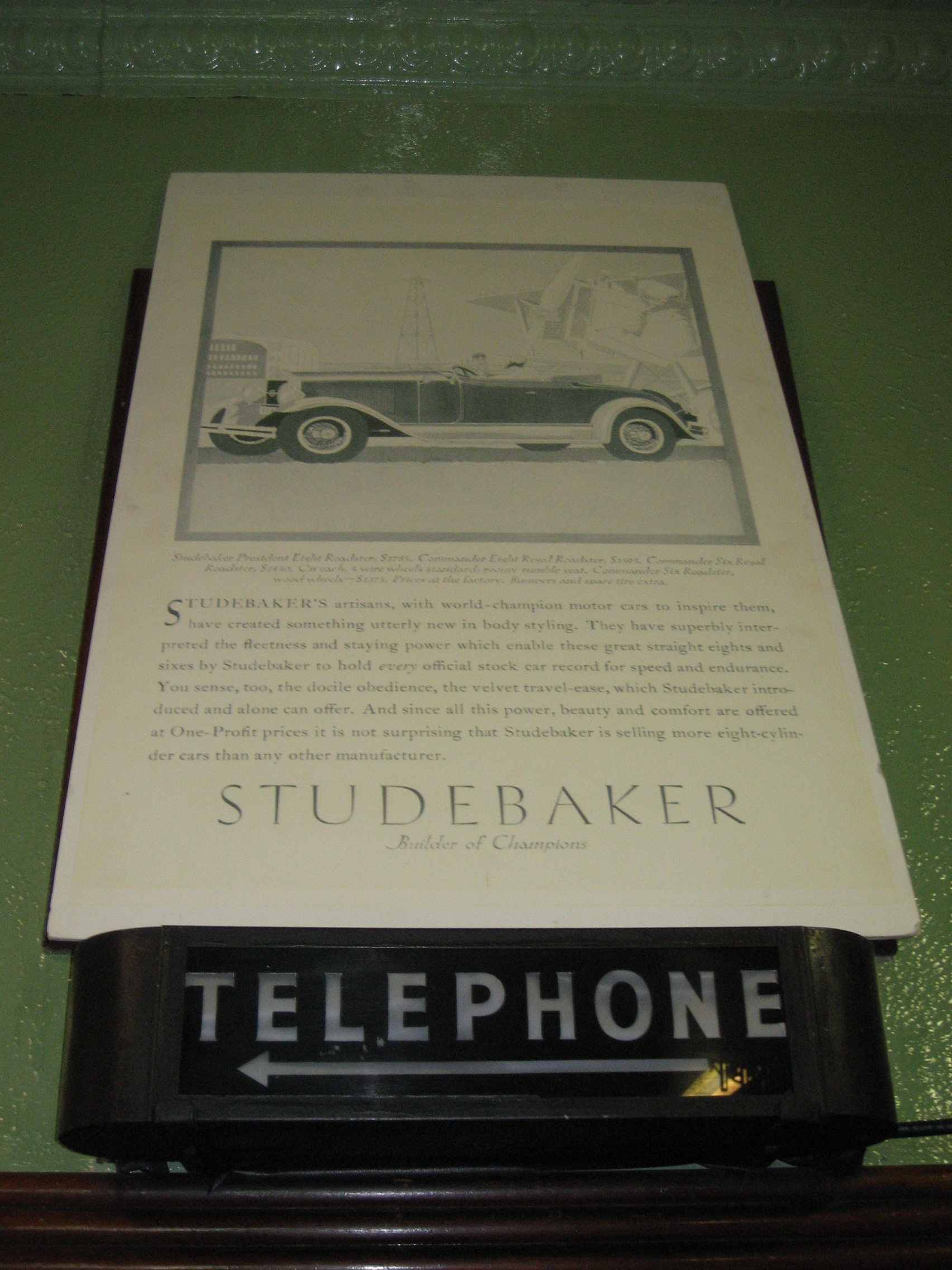
Studebaker sign,
De Luxe Restaurant

== Film studios ==
Digital Canaries began as a film production company in 2007. In 2015, they stopped producing in-house content.

As of 2021, the company managed six distinct film locations. Of these, five were situated in Hamilton, encompassing a 100,000 square-foot warehouse. This facility features a bar with an upstairs apartment and a large patio, a full-size banquet hall, and two school properties.

The final studio owned by Digital Canaries in Dundas includes sets of abandoned houses, tunnels, and post-apocalyptic landscapes. Its standing sets encompass various environments, such as hospitals, police precincts, and bars. Additionally, the location contains a thoroughly stocked prop house catering to diverse set design requirements, offering furniture, decorations, medical tools, and military gear.

The studio also features several full-sized airplanes and a flight simulator. It offers a diverse range of wardrobe options, including casual wear, evening dresses, wedding attire, first responder uniforms, and continuity clothing. The CEO of the studio is Simon Winterson.

Steel Work Studios opened in March 2008, aiming to get in on the $1 billion industry. It closed three months later.

A 2004 conversion of a 500,000-square-foot (46,000 m^{2}) facility on Victoria Avenue North that was one time home of the Otis Elevator Company and Studebaker plant into a film studio failed dramatically after only a few months. Local investors were ready to open up the $30-million Hamilton Film Studios but pulled out two months after opening.

In 2018, the NUVO Network opened its 150,000 square foot facility consisting of three state-of-the-art media production studios, podcasting facilities, recording and vlogging studios, alongside editing suites, office spaces, and events venue.

In December 2019, Hamilton Film Studios (commonly known as HFS) opened at 400 Wellington St. North in downtown Hamilton by filmmakers Zach Zohr, Graham Purdy and Ken Woychesko. The studio supports all film from Hollywood productions to indie movies, music videos to commercials. HFS also has a location in Dundas, a retail store in Hamilton (which caters to filmmakers) and offers equipment rentals and location support. It has helped to reinvigorate the film scene in Hamilton and has been praised for inserting a true film vendor in the city.

== Film list ==
The following is a partial list of films and television programs shot in Hamilton, Ontario, and their release dates:

- Hailey's Gift (1977 Family); Barry Morse, Kate Parr
- Strange Brew (1983); Rick Moranis, Dave Thomas
- Youngblood (1986); Rob Lowe, Patrick Swayze, Keanu Reeves
- Hearts of Fire (1987); Bob Dylan
- Amerika (1987 TV mini series)
- Bionic Showdown: The Six Million Dollar Man and The Bionic Woman (1989); Lee Majors
- The Cutting Edge (1992); D. B. Sweeney, Moira Kelly
- The Air Up There (1994); Kevin Bacon
- Camilla (1994); Bridget Fonda, Jessica Tandy
- Canadian Bacon (1995); Alan Alda, John Candy
- The Long Kiss Goodnight (1996); Samuel L. Jackson
- "Power Play" (1998–2000 TV series); Michael Riley
- The Big Hit (1998); Mark Wahlberg, Lou Diamond Phillips
- Detroit Rock City (1999); Rock group Kiss
- New Jersey Turnpikes (1999); Kelsey Grammer
- The Third Miracle (1999 Drama); Ed Harris
- The Time Shifters (1999 TV Sci-Fi/Action); Casper Van Dien
- Daydream Believers: The Monkees Story (2000)
- Gone in 60 Seconds (2000); Nicolas Cage, Robert Duvall, Angelina Jolie
- Rated X (2000); Charlie Sheen, Emilio Estevez
- X-Men (2000); Hugh Jackman, Patrick Stewart
- Finding Forrester (2000); Sean Connery
- Laughter on the 23rd Floor (2001 TV Comedy); Nathan Lane
- Brian's Song (2001 TV movie)
- Exit Wounds (2001); Steven Seagal
- Glitter (2001); Mariah Carey
- Sins of the Father (2002 docudrama), Tom Sizemore, Richard Jenkins
- Our America (2002 TV Drama); Vanessa A. Williams
- John Q (2002); Denzel Washington
- Avenging Angelo (2002); Sylvester Stallone
- Death to Smoochy (2002); Robin Williams
- Global Heresy (2002); Peter O'Toole
- RFK (2002 TV Drama); Linus Roache
- Second String (2002 TV Comedy/Drama); Jon Voight
- The Limit (2003 Crime Drama); Lauren Bacall, Henry Czerny
- Wrong Turn (2003); Desmond Harrington
- Bulletproof Monk (2003); Chow Yun-Fat
- How to Deal (2003); Mandy Moore
- Spinning Boris (2003); Jeff Goldblum, Anthony LaPaglia
- Direct Action (2004); Dolph Lundgren
- Saint Ralph (2004); Adam Butcher
- Prom Queen: The Marc Hall Story (2004 TV movie)
- Against the Ropes (2004); Meg Ryan
- Resident Evil: Apocalypse (2004); Milla Jovovich
- The Confessor (aka: The Good Shepherd) (2004); Christian Slater
- Land of the Dead (2005); Dennis Hopper
- The Man (2005) Samuel L. Jackson, Eugene Levy
- Cinderella Man (2005) Russell Crowe, Renée Zellweger
- Zoom (2005); Tim Allen, Courteney Cox
- Riding the Bus with My Sister (2005); Rosie O'Donnell
- Four Brothers (2005); Mark Wahlberg
- Cheaper by the Dozen 2 (2005); Steve Martin, Bonnie Hunt
- Lie with Me (2005 Drama/Romance); Lauren Lee Smith, Eric Balfour
- Terry (2005 TV Movie); Shawn Ashmore
- Swarmed (2005 TV Movie); Michael Shanks
- Plague City: SARS in Toronto (2005 TV movie)
- Solar Attack (2005 Sci-Fi/Thriller); Louis Gossett Jr.
- Shades of Black: The Conrad Black Story (2006 TV Drama); Jason Priestley
- The Last Sect (2006); David Carradine
- It's a Boy Girl Thing (2006 Comedy/Romance); Samaire Armstrong, Kevin Zegers
- Man of the Year (2006); Robin Williams, Christopher Walken
- Silent Hill (2006); Radha Mitchell, Sean Bean
- The Path to 9/11 (2006 TV Movie); Harvey Keitel
- Firehouse Dog (2006 Disney); Bruce Greenwood
- Snow Cake (2006); Sigourney Weaver
- Away from Her (2006); Julie Christie, Gordon Pinsent
- The War at Home (2006 TV series); Rob Lotterstein
- American Pie Presents: The Naked Mile (2006 Universal)
- Skinwalkers (2006); Jason Behr
- UKM: The Ultimate Killing Machine (2006 Horror); Michael Madsen
- "The Tracey Fragments" (2007 Drama); Elliot Page
- The Four Horsemen (2007)
- American Pie Presents: Beta House (2007 Comedy); John White, Steve Talley
- Hairspray (2007 Musical); John Travolta, Michelle Pfeiffer
- Talk to Me (2007 Bio-drama); Don Cheadle, Martin Sheen
- Pigs (2007 Comedy/Drama); Jefferson Brown, Darryn Lucio
- Final Draft (2007 Horror); James Van Der Beek, Darryn Lucio
- Weirdsville (2007 Comedy/drama); Matt Frewer
- Closing the Ring (2007); Christopher Plummer, Shirley MacLaine
- Final Draft (2007); Jeff Roop
- Left for Dead (2007 Horror); Steve Byers
- The Poet (2007 Drama); Jonathan Scarfe
- The Company (2007 TV Drama/Thriller mini-series); Michael Keaton, Chris O'Donnell, Alfred Molina
- The Incredible Hulk (2008 Action/Drama/Sci-Fi); Edward Norton, Tim Roth
- Flash of Genius (2008); Greg Kinnear
- Traitor (2008 Drama); Jeff Daniels, Don Cheadle
- XIII (2008 Action, TV mini-series); Val Kilmer, Stephen Dorff
- Right Hand Man (2008 Crime, TV); Joe Mantegna
- Weapon (2008 Action); Bruce Greenwood
- The Time Traveler's Wife (2008 Sci-Fi/ Romance); Eric Bana, Rachel McAdams
- Splice (2009 Sci-Fi); Sarah Polley, Adrien Brody
- The Summit (2008 TV Drama/ Thriller mini-series); Christopher Plummer, Wendy Crewson
- The Good Witch (2008 TV Family); It starred Catherine Bell and Chris Potter.
- Max Payne (2008 Action Thriller); Mark Wahlberg, Beau Bridges, Chris O'Donnell, Mila Kunis
- Real Time (2008 Comedy/drama); Randy Quaid
- The Last Hit Man (2008 Crime); Joe Mantegna, Elizabeth Whitmere
- Amelia (2009 Drama); Hilary Swank, Richard Gere
- Repo Men (2009 Sci-Fi Thriller); Jude Law, Forest Whitaker
- Defendor (2009 Comedy/Drama); Woody Harrelson, Elias Koteas
- The Boondock Saints II: All Saints Day (2009 Action/Comedy); Sean Patrick Flanery, Norman Reedus
- Kick-Ass (2009 Action Comedy); Nicolas Cage, Aaron Johnson
- You Might as Well Live (2009 Comedy); Joshua Peace, Michael Madsen
- The Con Artist (2010); Sarah Roemer
- Casino Jack (2010); Kevin Spacey, Rachelle Lefevre
- Resident Evil: Retribution (2011); Milla Jovovich
- Red Lights (2012 Drama/Horror/Thriller); Robert De Niro, Cillian Murphy
- Jesus Henry Christ (2012 Comedy); Toni Collette, Michael Sheen
- Mama (2013 Horror); Jessica Chastain, Nikolaj Coster-Waldau
- The Mortal Instruments: City of Bones (2013 film); Lily Collins
- Kick-Ass 2 (2013) Superhero, Action, Comedy; Aaron Johnson, Chloë Grace Moretz, Christopher Mintz-Plasse, Jim Carrey
- RoboCop (2014)
- Crimson Peak (2015); Tom Hiddleston, Charlie Hunnam
- Pixels (2015); Adam Sandler, Peter Dinklage, Josh Gad
- It (2017 film) (2017); Jaeden Lieberher, Bill Skarsgård
- xXx: The Return of Xander Cage (2017); Vin Diesel, Donnie Yen, Ruby Rose
- The Shape of Water (film) (2017); Sally Hawkins, Michael Shannon, Richard Jenkins
- Taken (2017–present); Clive Standen, Gaius Charles, Brooklyn Sudano
- The Handmaid's Tale (TV series) (2017–present); Elisabeth Moss, Joseph Fiennes, Yvonne Strahovski
- The Umbrella Academy (TV series) (2019-present); Elliot Page, Tom Hopper, Colm Feore
- Chucky (TV series) (2021-present); Zackary Arthur, Brad Dourif, Jennifer Tilly

== Images ==
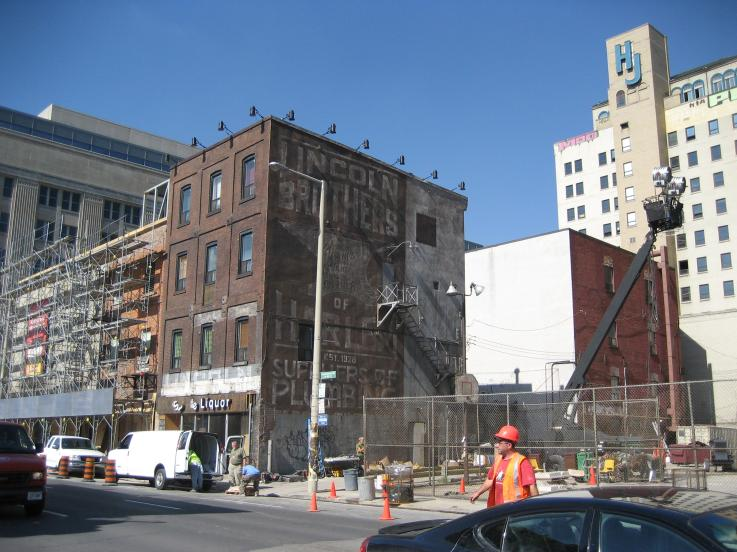
Incredible Hulk, film shoot, Main Street East

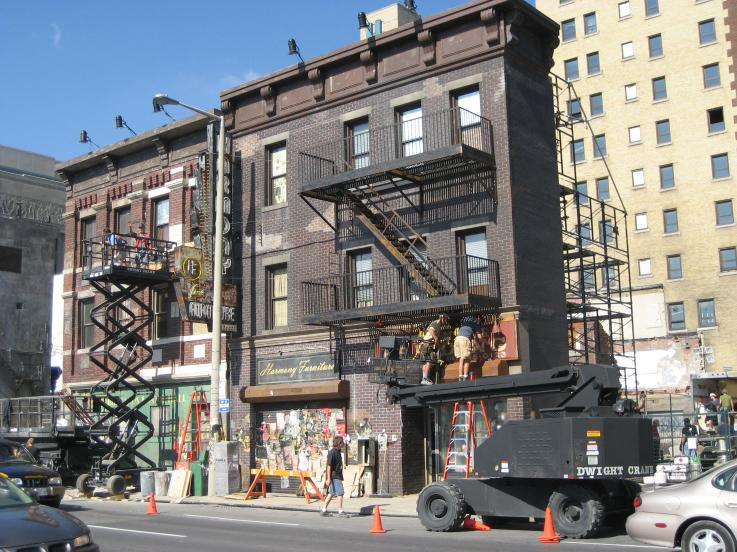
Incredible Hulk, film shoot

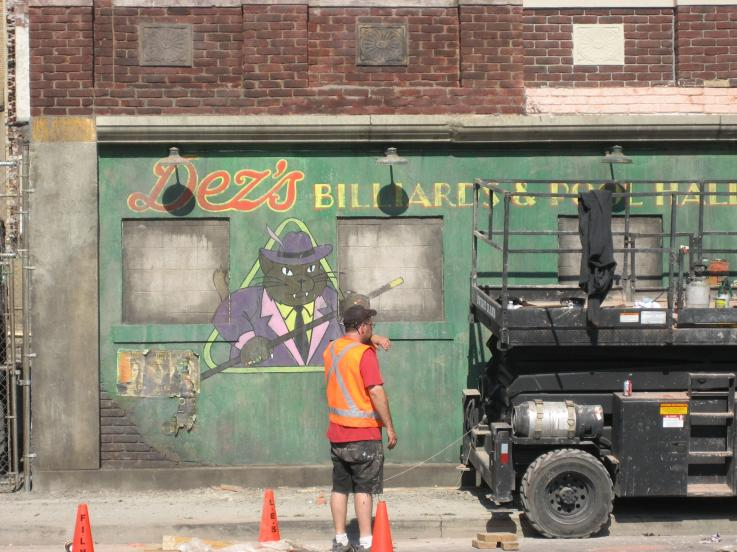
Incredible Hulk, film shoot

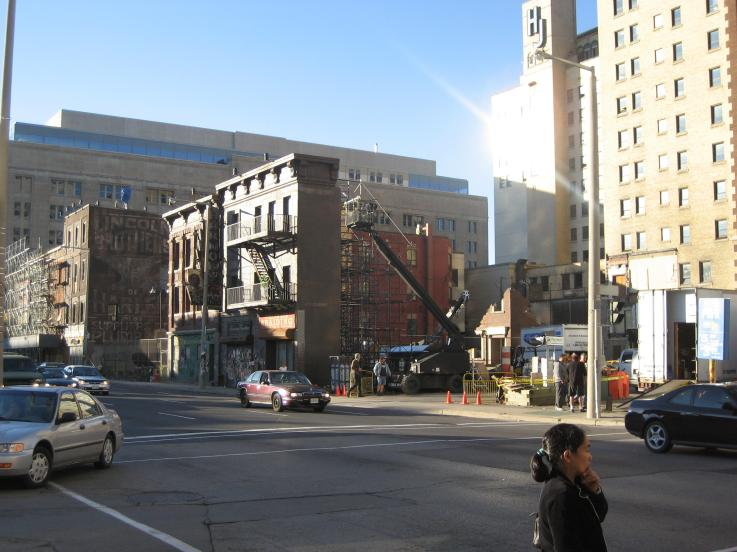
Incredible Hulk, film shoot
