= Tara Spencer-Nairn =

Canadian actress (born 1978)

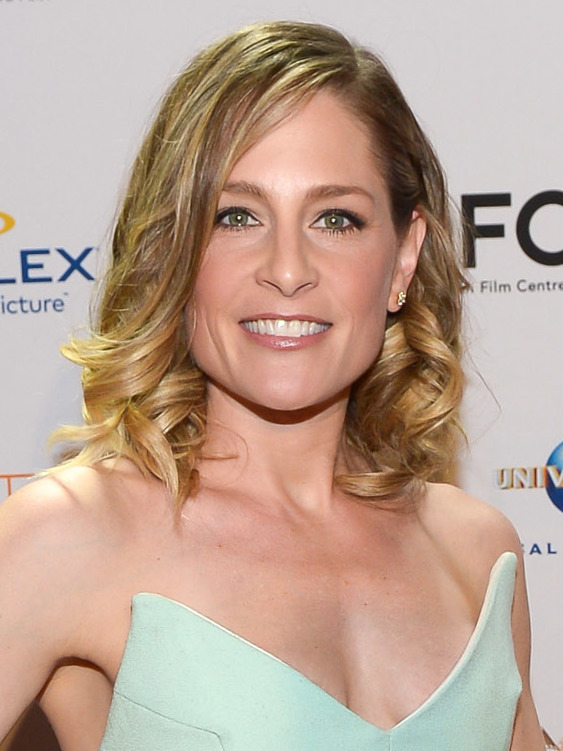
- Spencer-Nairn in 2017
- Born: January 6, 1978 (age 48); Montreal, Quebec, Canada
- Years active: 1996–present
- Height: 5 ft 3 in (160 cm)
- Spouse: Josh Glover (m. 2008)
- Children: 2
- Relatives: Douglas Spencer-Nairn (grandfather)

Tara Spencer-Nairn (born January 6, 1978) is a Canadian actress best known for her work on the television series Corner Gas.

== Early life ==
Spencer-Nairn was born on January 6, 1978 in Montreal, Quebec, but raised in Vancouver, British Columbia. She is a graduate of the Vancouver Film School.

== Career ==
Spencer-Nairn has appeared in a number of film and TV productions since the mid-1990s. Some of her most notable film appearances include New Waterford Girl, Wishmaster: The Prophecy Fulfilled, and television guest appearances on Puppets Who Kill, Relic Hunter, Cold Squad, Bliss, Flashpoint, and The Outer Limits. In 2005, she portrayed Wayne Gretzky's sister Kim Gretzky in the movie Waking Up Wally: The Walter Gretzky Story.

Her most notable roles are Dog River Police Department (DRPD) Constable Karen Pelly on Corner Gas and Sandy Wardwell on CTV's The Listener. Concurrent to appearing in Corner Gas, she also appeared on the science fiction series ReGenesis.

== Personal life ==
Spencer-Nairn married Josh Glover in 2008. Together, they have sons Foster (born 2011) and Carson (born 2014).

Spencer-Nairn is the younger daughter and youngest of the three children of John Chaloner Spencer-Nairn, the Old Etonian second son of Scottish politician Douglas Spencer-Nairn of the Spencer-Nairn baronets, and his second wife Lucie (née Belanger).

== Filmography ==
=== Film ===
Year	Title	Role	Notes
1999	New Waterford Girl	Lou Benzoa	
2002	Wishmaster: The Prophecy Fulfilled	Lisa Burnley	Direct-to-video
2002	Rub & Tug	Betty	
2005	Waking Up Wally: The Walter Gretzky Story	Kim Gretzky	
2006	Password	Daisy	Short film
2007	The Third Eye	Nika Printz	
2007	The Interior Monologue of Gill the Goldfish	The Dame (voice)	Short film
2007	Final Draft	Kate Twist	
2014	Corner Gas: The Movie	Constable Karen Pelly	Reprise of role from the 2004–2009 Corner Gas TV series
2019	James vs. His Future Self		
2024	Home Free	Ivy Homur	
TBA	Last the Night	Barb	Filming

=== Television ===
Year	Title	Role	Notes
1996	Two	Suzanne	Episode: "Prom Night"
1997–98	The Outer Limits	Heather	Episodes: "Double Helix" and "The Origin of Species"
1998	Poltergeist: The Legacy	Cindy Smith	Episode: "The Enlightened One"
1998	Breaker High	Bonnie	Episode: "To Kill a MockingNerd"
1998	Cold Squad	Amanda Millerd	Episode: "Amanda Millerd"
1998	The Inspectors	Melissa Kaline	TV film
1998	Dead Man's Gun	Anna Bevington	Episode: "The Collector"
1998	First Wave	Cassandra	Episode: "Speaking in Tongues"
1998	Night Man	Julia	Episode: "It Came from Out of the Sky"
1998	Don't Look Down	Rachel	TV film
1999	H-E Double Hockey Sticks	Anne	TV film
2001	Relic Hunter	Jamie Palmerston	Episode: "Treasure Island"
2002	Moville Mysteries	Mimi Valentine (voice)	Main role; 26 episodes
2002	Bliss	Jeanette	Episode: "The Value of X"
2002	Tom Stone	Annie	Episode: "Little Bitty"
2002	Tracker	Erica / Vegna / Evgna	Episodes: "Love, Cirronian Style", "Remember When"
2003	Big Spender	Mel Tennant	TV film
2004	Puppets Who Kill	Oxana	Episode: "Dead Ted"
2004	Blue Murder	Melanie Coombs	Episode: "Cell Block 13"
2004	ReGenesis	Twyla	Episode: "Baby Bomb"
2004–2009	Corner Gas	Karen Pelly	Main role; 107 episodes Nominated – Gemini Award for Best Ensemble Performance in a Comedy Program or Series (2004); Nominated – Gemini Award for Best Ensemble Performance in a Comedy Program or Series (2006); Won – Gemini Award for Best Ensemble Performance in a Comedy Program or Series (2007)
2005	More Sex & the Single Mom	Blair	TV film
2006	Cradle of Lies	Lisa	TV film
2006	Naked Josh	Becky	Episode: "Planned Parenthood"
2009	The Ron James Show		Episode: "1.7"
2010	Cancel Christmas	Michelle Morgan	TV film
2011–14	The Listener	Sandy Wardwell	Recurring role (30 episodes)
2012	Degrassi: The Next Generation	Mrs. Baker	Episodes: "Building a Mystery: Parts 1 & 2"
2012	Flashpoint	Laney Summers	Episode: "Forget Oblivion"
2013	Murdoch Mysteries	Pauline Kerr	Episode: "Murdochophobia"
2015	Saving Hope	Janice Fenn	Episode: "Heart of Stone"
2015	The Preacher's Sin	Lauren Tanning	TV film
2017	Killjoys	Kitaan	2 episodes
2018-2021	Corner Gas Animated	Karen Pelly (voice)	
2018	MasterChef Canada	Herself	Guest judge
2018	Christmas Around the Corner	Suzanne	TV film
2019	Hudson & Rex	Eloise Benson	Episode 6: "Murder She Thought"
2021	Evil Stepmom	Caroline	TV film
2022	Ghosts	Young Carol Martino	Episode: "Dumb Deaths"
2023	You're My Hero	Angela	10 episodes
2025	Brilliant Minds	Jenna Driscoll	Episode: "The Doctor Whose World Collapsed"
2025	The Trades	Daina	4 episodes
