= Juravinski Hospital =

- Hamilton Health Sciences
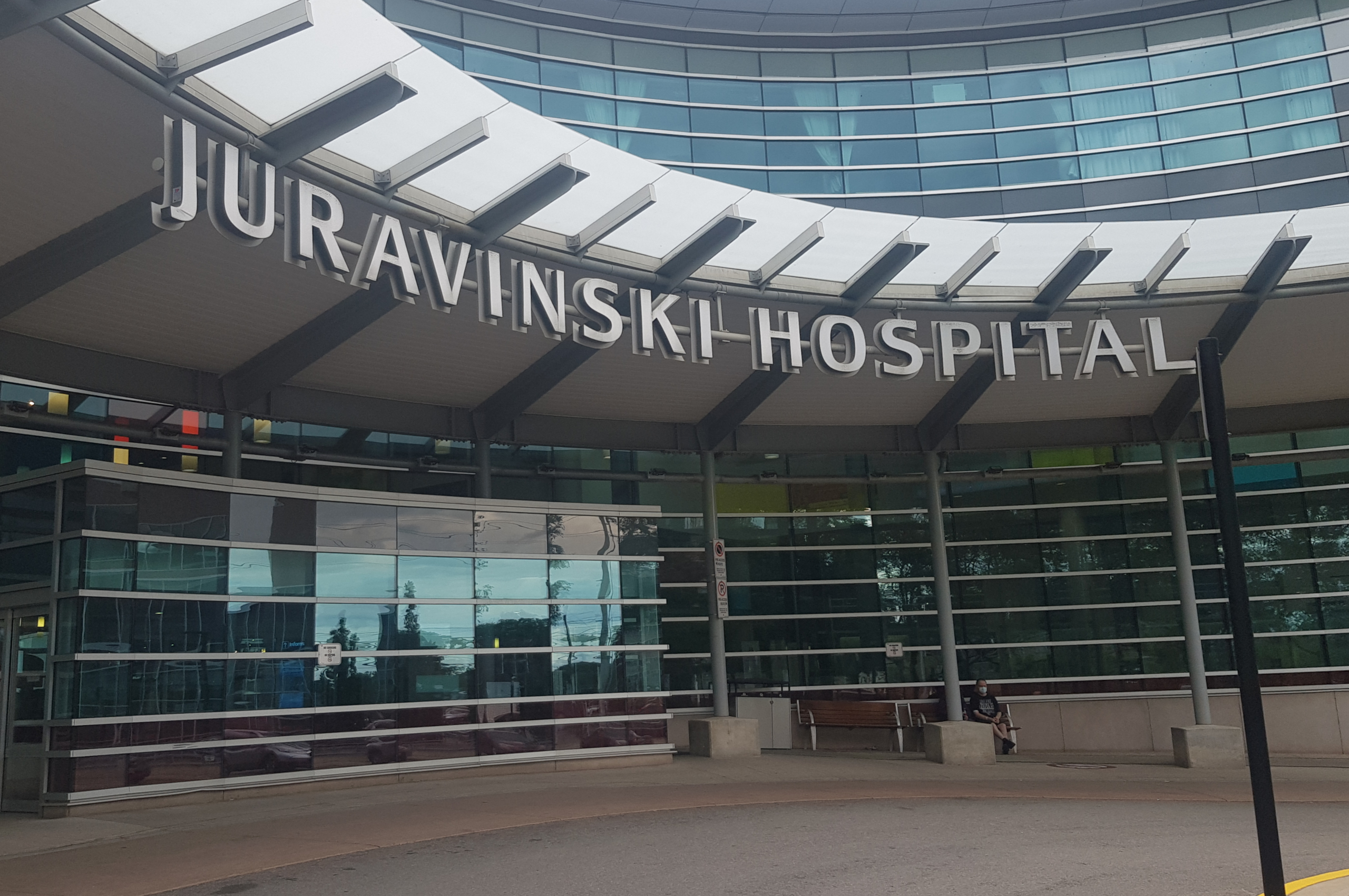

Geography
- Location: Hamilton, Ontario, Canada
- Coordinates: 43°14′23″N 79°50′41″W

Organization
- Care system: Public Medicare (Canada) (OHIP)
- Type: Teaching, Specialist
- Affiliated university: McMaster University
- Network: Hamilton Health Sciences

Services
- Emergency department: Yes
- Beds: 228

History
- Founded: 1917 (as Mount Hamilton Hospital)

Links
- Website: Official website
- Lists: Hospitals in Canada

The Juravinski Hospital is a hospital in Hamilton, Ontario, Canada operated by Hamilton Health Sciences. It is located adjacent to the Juravinski Cancer Centre. The hospital was ranked 2nd in Canada for research according to Research Infosource Inc. in 2014.

Juravinski Hospital and Cancer Centre is a full-service general hospital offering cancer care, orthopedics and hepatobiliary surgery. The site's focus is cancer care services, with programs ranging from prevention, screening and diagnosis to treatment including chemotherapy and the region's only radiation treatment program. In addition, the Juravinski Hospital is the site of the Hamilton region's only hepatobiliary surgery center.

== History ==
The site was first occupied by Mount Hamilton Hospital, which opened on Concession Street in April 1917 to help care for veterans of the First World War.

In 1954, Nora-Frances Henderson Hospital opened as a 322-bed maternity hospital on the same site. It was named after the first woman on Hamilton City Council and the first elected to a Canadian city Board of Control. She was a journalist and activist who had promoted children's and women's rights to health care. The hospital operated as Henderson General Hospital for several years.

The site was redeveloped in 2010, and renamed Juravinski Hospital after Charles Juravinski, former owner of the Flamboro Downs racetrack. He and his wife Margaret donated $43 million to Hamilton city hospitals.

== Fundraising ==
The Hamilton Health Sciences Foundation raises funds to support the Juravinski Hospital and Cancer Centre including: facilities, equipment, research, patient amenities, and staff education.
