= McMaster Children's Hospital =

- Hamilton Health Sciences

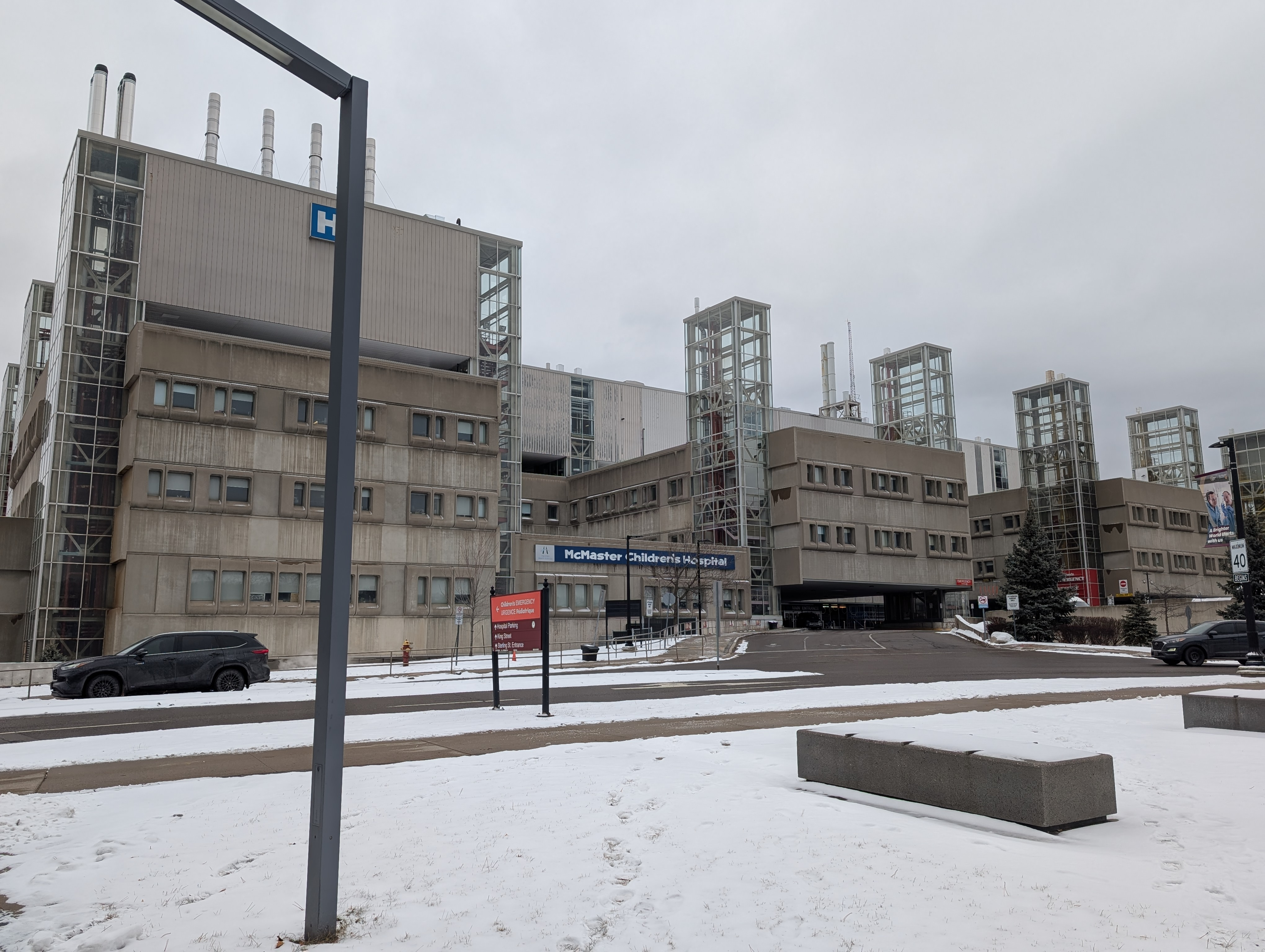
- Entrance of McMaster Children's Hospital

Geography
- Location: Hamilton, Ontario, Canada
- Coordinates: 43°15′32″N 79°55′6″W

Organization
- Care system: OHIP (Ontario Health Insurance Plan)
- Type: Teaching, Children's hospital, Specialist
- Affiliated university: McMaster University

Services
- Emergency department: Level 1 Pediatric Trauma Centre CHYMES (Child and Youth Mental Health Emergency Services) Critical, Acute, and Ambulatory Services Children's Only Helipad- TC LID: CPJ3
- Beds: 184

History
- Founded: 1988

Links
- Website: mcmasterchildrenshospital.ca
- Lists: Hospitals in Canada

McMaster Children's Hospital (MCH), in Hamilton, Ontario, is one of Canada's largest pediatric academic tertiary care teaching hospitals affiliated with McMaster University. It is operated by Hamilton Health Sciences and is within the McMaster University Medical Centre. It became a children's hospital in 1988. The hospital was recently ranked second in Canada for research

In 2017, the hospital opened a new clinic for dialysis.

The Neonatal Intensive Care Unit (NICU), with 72 beds, provides specialized care for newborns and infants with certain conditions that benefit from intensive care.

== Gallery ==
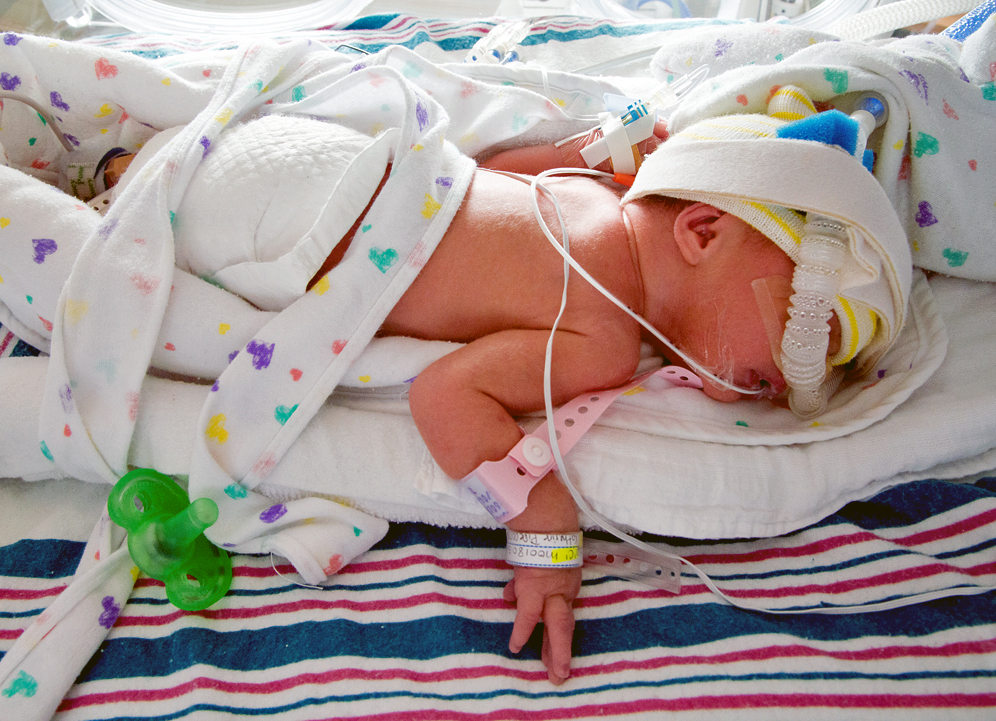
Premature infant in the NICU

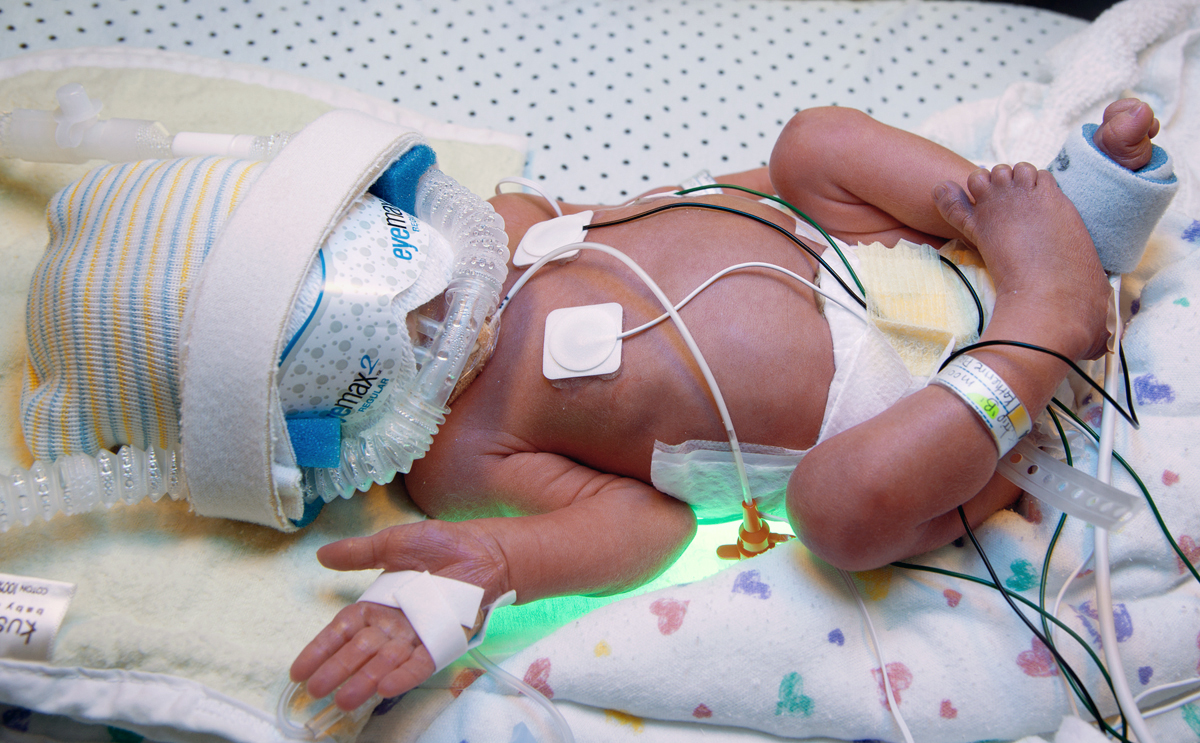
Premature infant in an incubator at the Mcmaster Children's Hospital NICU
