= Greg Plitt =

American fitness model and actor (1977–2015)

- Born: George Gregory Plitt Jr. November 3, 1977; Baltimore, Maryland, U.S.
- Died: January 17, 2015 (aged 37); Burbank, California, U.S.
- Cause of death: Struck by a train
- Education: United States Military Academy
- Occupations: Fitness model; actor
- Modeling information
- Height: 6 ft 1 in (1.85 m)
- Hair color: Brown
- Eye color: Green
- Website: gregplitt.com

George Gregory Plitt Jr. (November 3, 1977 – January 17, 2015) was an American fitness model and actor. He starred in the Bravo television series Work Out. He died at age 37 when he was struck by a train locomotive while filming a video.

== Early life and education ==
Greg Plitt was originally from Lutherville, Maryland. His mother was an interior designer, and his father was a real estate agent. Plitt had an older sister who attended the United States Naval Academy.

Plitt said that he had been a fitness buff since his father bought a home gym when Plitt was in sixth grade; he was further inspired after seeing how his older sister changed after her first year in the Naval Academy.

Plitt was a graduate of Gilman School, Class of 1996, in Baltimore, Maryland, where he was on the football, wrestling, and golf teams. He was also a graduate of the United States Military Academy, Class of 2000, and was both Airborne and Ranger qualified.

== Career ==
Plitt served in the US Army as a Ranger for five years.

He was a certified personal trainer in Los Angeles. He was a member of the official MET-Rx athlete and was awarded the MET-Rx Athlete of the Year award for 2012. He was the author of the workout program MFT28 as featured by Bodybuilding.com and appeared on covers and/or in editorials for Maxim, AXL, American Health & Fitness, Flaunt, Men's Fitness, Muscle & Fitness, Men's Health, FitnessRx for Men, Instinct Magazine, and Men's Exercise, among others.

Plitt compared his work as a physical trainer to his work training military recruits:

That transformation that you see when someone becomes a soldier; many of them come in with real bad attitudes.... they start changing their ways and they become the men they always wanted to be. Then other soldiers start looking up to them as role models. Then they're proud and they hold their heads high. That's more gratifying than anything I've done. That's what's so cool about it — to be able to train somebody and transform them and bring out all of the great qualities that everyone possesses.

Plitt was a global spokesperson/model for Thierry Mugler's Angel Men and ICE*Men men's fragrances. He did TV commercials for Old Spice Body Wash, ESPN's Great Outdoor Games, Under Armour, MTV, Zoli Sinks, Gold's Gym Power Flex, Bowflex, and modeled for Under Armour, Old Navy Jeans, Calvin Klein, Modell's, and Skimpies, among others.

In his later career, he had several acting roles. Images of his body were used to create Dr. Manhattan's muscular physique in the 2009 film Watchmen, as well as the corpse of General Zod in Batman v Superman: Dawn of Justice.

== Death ==
Plitt was struck and killed by a southbound Metrolink Antelope Valley Line train 268, led by Metrolink MP36PH-3C locomotive no. 888 in Burbank, California, on January 17, 2015, while running between the rails. The entire incident resulting in his death was recorded by an onboard event recorder camera mounted in the cab of the lead locomotive. After examining the video, police reportedly told TMZ Plitt may have been trying to outrace the train when it approached for a video he was shooting. He was shortly after knocked off the tracks and out of frame. He may have believed the train was coming up behind him on a parallel track, not the one he was on. The video was for a self-produced energy drink commercial.

== Filmography ==
| Year | Title | Role | Notes |
|---|---|---|---|
| 2015 | Friends to Lovers? | Himself | Reality TV; Season 1 |
| 2014 | Mystery Millionaire | Himself | Secret Dating Show (episode 1.3) |
| 2013 | Grudge Match | Skydiving Instructor | |
| 2013 | Work Out in the Zone | Himself (Personal Trainer) | |
| 2011 | Paul Cruz: Latin Actor (A Mockuseries) | Jeremy | TV Comedy |
| 2009 | Terminator Salvation | Hybrid Male | (deleted scenes) |
| 2009 | Watchmen | Dr. Manhattan (CGI) | |
| 2008 | Work Out | Himself (Personal Trainer) | (7 episodes) |
| 2007 | Last Call Before Sunset | Rico | |
| 2007 | Six Sex Scenes and a Murder | Robert | |
| 2007 | Extra | Himself | Entertainment News Show |
| 2007–08 | Days of Our Lives | Henderson | |
| 2007–08 | Designed to Sell | Himself-Carpenter | (episodes 4.1 to 4.21) |
| 2006 | The Good Shepherd | Guard with Sullivan | |
| 2006 | Bobby | Bellhop | |
| 2006 | Seduction | Male lead | Thalia Music Video |
| 2006 | Identity | Himself (Stranger) | TV series (episode 1.2) |
