= Pigs (2007 film) =

2007 film by Karl DiPelino

- Directed by: Karl DiPelino
- Written by: Karl DiPelino; Chris Ragonetti
- Produced by: Chris Ragonetti
- Starring: Jefferson Brown; Darryn Lucio; Melanie Marden; Christopher Elliott
- Cinematography: Gurjeet Mann
- Edited by: Karl DiPelino
- Music by: John Jamieson
- Distributed by: THINKFilm
- Release date: November 5, 2007
- Running time: 85 minutes
- Country: Canada
- Language: English

Pigs is a 2007 Canadian teen comedy directed by Karl DiPelino. The title refers to the slang meaning of the word pig, an egoist; someone who disregards others' feelings and acts out of self-interest.

== Plot ==
Ladies' man and soon-to-be college graduate Miles is a player who keeps journals to record his "conquests." His friend Cleaver thinks Miles should accept a bet: can Miles sleep with enough girls before he graduates, to complete the alphabet (using the first letter in the girls' surnames)? Having already conquered a number of girls with different first letters in their surnames, Miles stands a good chance of being able to succeed. It all boils down to whether he can find and sleep with a girl whose surname starts with an X. Miles' roommate Ben, however will prove to be a problem for Miles, since he has a crush on Gabrielle, Miles' target. At the end of the bet, Cleaver tries to push Miles even harder, since the pot has grown to 30,000 dollars. Miles, however, has fallen for Gabrielle, who is different from every girl he's ever met. They start dating, and Ben becomes more jealous. Ben decides to ruin Miles' chances of sleeping with Gabrielle by telling Gabrielle about the bet, even though Miles has clearly explained that Gabrielle means more to him than the money.

== Cast ==
- Jefferson Brown as Miles
- Darryn Lucio as Cleaver
- Melanie Marden as Gabrielle "X"
- Christopher Elliott as Ben
- Kelly Cunningham as Wendy "P"
- Katharine Jane Reid as Fran
- Tyrone Greenidge as Big Eddie
- Derek Cvitkovic as Silvio
- Ted Neal as Tommy
- Heidi Rayden as Michelle Noonan
- Leslie Ferreira as Stacy Usher/Swanson
- Sarah Scheffer as Vicky
- Subeena Ishaq as Rebecca Stinson
- Kim Allan as Party Girl
- Yo Mustafa as Waiter
- Chris Traps as Struggler on Cutting Room Floor

== Themes and reception ==
The Georgia Straight indicated that the 1981 sex teen comedy Porky's "was more of an inspiration". The Film Board of Québec found, "This comedy is fueled by testosterone and aimed primarily at a teenage audience." The film uses crude language with sexual connotations. In addition, there are a few scenes where sexual acts are simulated without nudity."

The Hamilton Spectator commented on the film by asking, "The final question remains - are all guys PIGS?"
