= Flamboro Downs =

Racetrack in Flamborough, Ontario

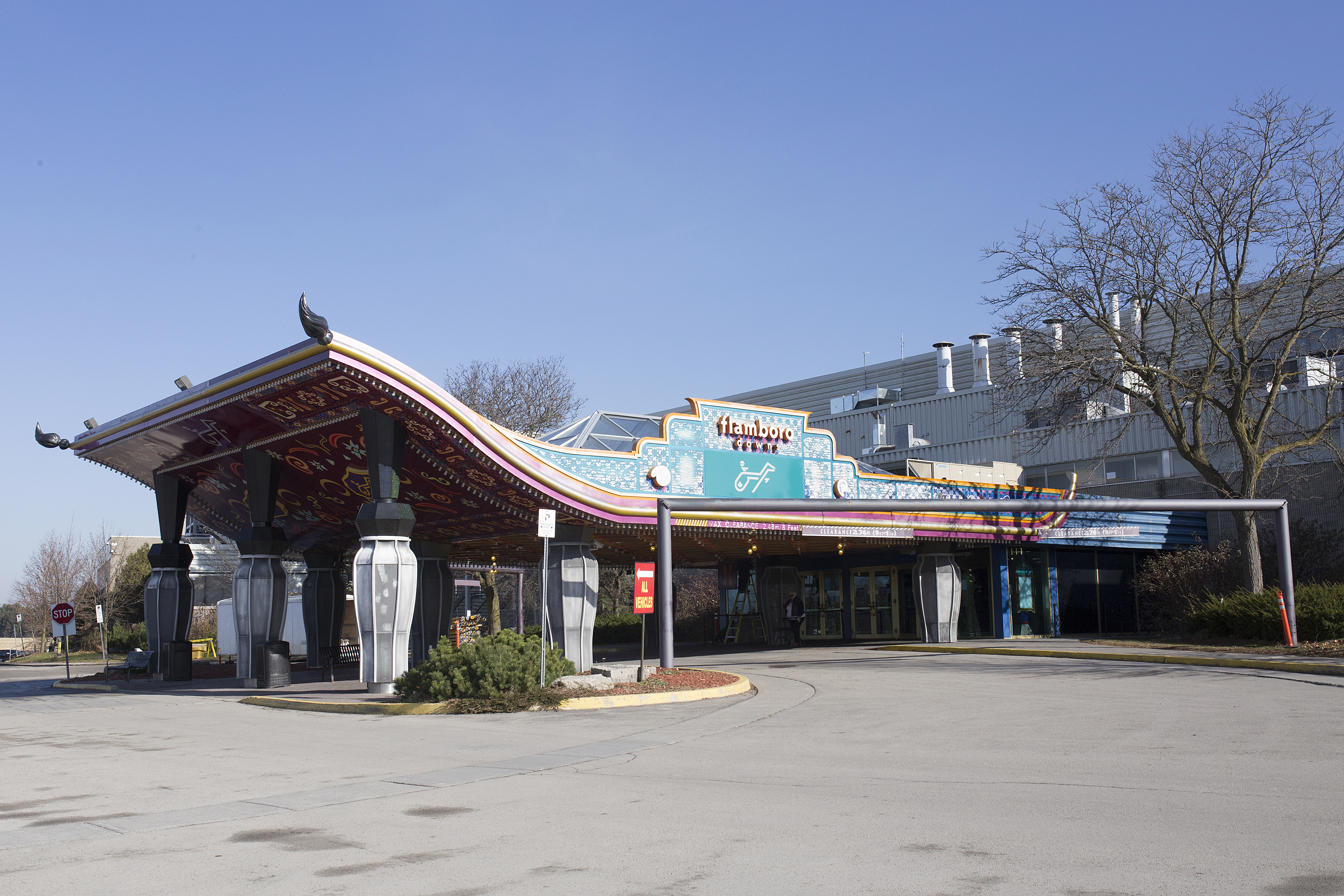
- Exterior of Flamboro Downs in 2019
- Interactive map of Flamboro Downs
- Location: Flamborough, Ontario, Canada
- Coordinates: 43°18′0″N 80°1′27″W
- Owned by: Great Canadian Gaming
- Date opened: 1971
- Race type: Harness racing

Flamboro Downs is a half-mile harness horse racing track in Flamborough, Hamilton, Ontario, Canada. It is also home to Flamboro Slots, which has a total of 808 slot machines.

The racetrack was founded in 1971 by Charles Juravinski and acquired in 2003 by Magna Entertainment. In 2005, it was acquired by the Great Canadian Gaming Corporation.

== See also ==
- List of sports venues in Hamilton, Ontario
- List of attractions in Hamilton, Ontario
