= Hamilton Health Sciences =

Hamilton Health Services

Geography
- Location: Ontario, Canada

Organization
- Care system: Canadian Healthcare
- Affiliated university: McMaster University

Links
- Lists: Hospitals in Canada

Hamilton Health Sciences (HHS) is a hospital network of 11 hospitals centres located in Hamilton, Ontario, Canada, but serving patients from across the region and province. It is affiliated with McMaster University. For over 10 years, HHS has ranked as one of Canada's Top 10 Research Hospitals on Research Infosource's Top 40 Hospitals in Canada list.

== Hospitals and Centres ==
- Hamilton General Hospital
- Juravinski Cancer Centre
- Juravinski Hospital
- McMaster Children's Hospital
- McMaster University Medical Centre
- Main Street West Urgent Care Centre
- Regional Rehabilitation Centre
- Ron Joyce Children's Health Centre
- Satellite Health Facility
- St. Peter's Hospital
- West Lincoln Memorial Hospital (located in Grimsby)

== Overview ==
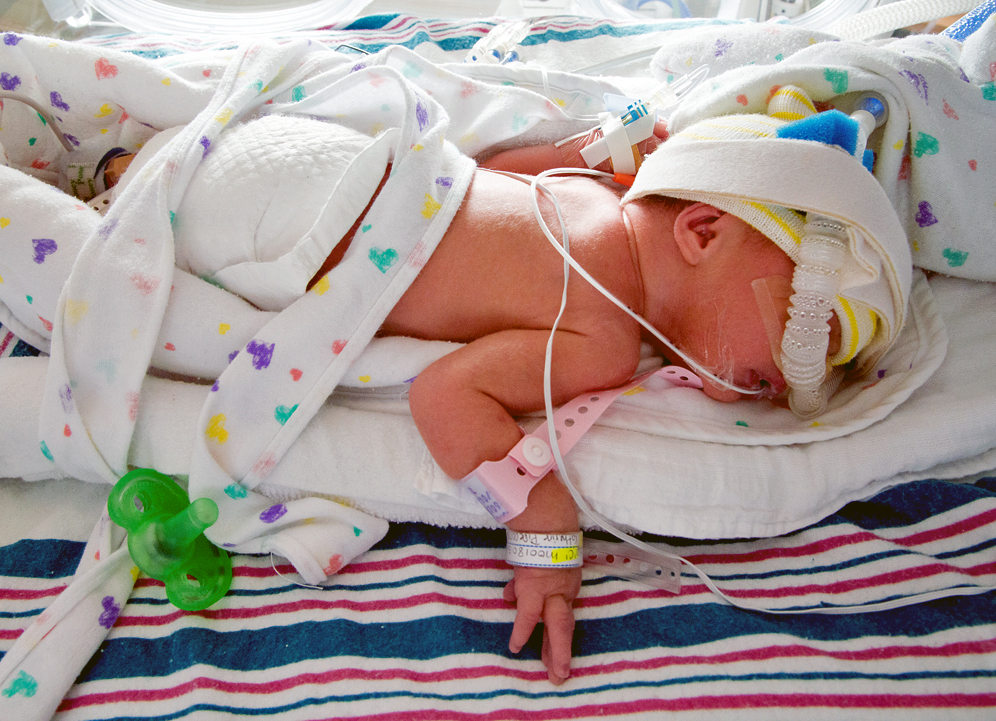
Premature infant in the NICU at McMaster Children's Hospital

Hamilton Health Sciences is affiliated with the Michael G. DeGroote School of Medicine at McMaster University. In October 2008, the Hamilton Health Sciences Corporation was named one of "Canada's Top 100 Employers" by Mediacorp Canada Inc. and was featured in Maclean's newsmagazine.

It was formed in 1996 when Hamilton General, Henderson General, McMaster University Medical Centre, McMaster Children's Hospital and Chedoke Hospital merged to form Hamilton Health Sciences Corporation. The union formed one of the largest teaching hospitals in Ontario with four sites, approximately 8,000 employees, and 1,000 physicians. St. Peter's Hospital became part of Hamilton Health Sciences in 2008, and West Lincoln Memorial Hospital in 2014.

The David Braley Cardiac, Vascular and Stroke Research Institute opened in 2010 and is located behind the Hamilton General Hospital. It is a $90 million research centre and employees nearly 500 scientists. The new building is 165,000 square feet (15,300 m^{2}). David Braley contributed $10 million towards the project.

Hamilton Health Sciences Foundation is a registered charitable organization that supports Hamilton Health Sciences.

The Ron Joyce Children's Centre, which opened in the fall 2015, is the only centre of its kind in Canada. The purpose built facility houses a variety of programs including: Autism Spectrum Disorder Service, Child and Youth Mental Health Program, Developmental Pediatrics and Rehabilitation Program, Prosthetics and Orthotics Services and Audiology Services.
