= McMaster University Medical Centre =

- Hamilton Health Sciences
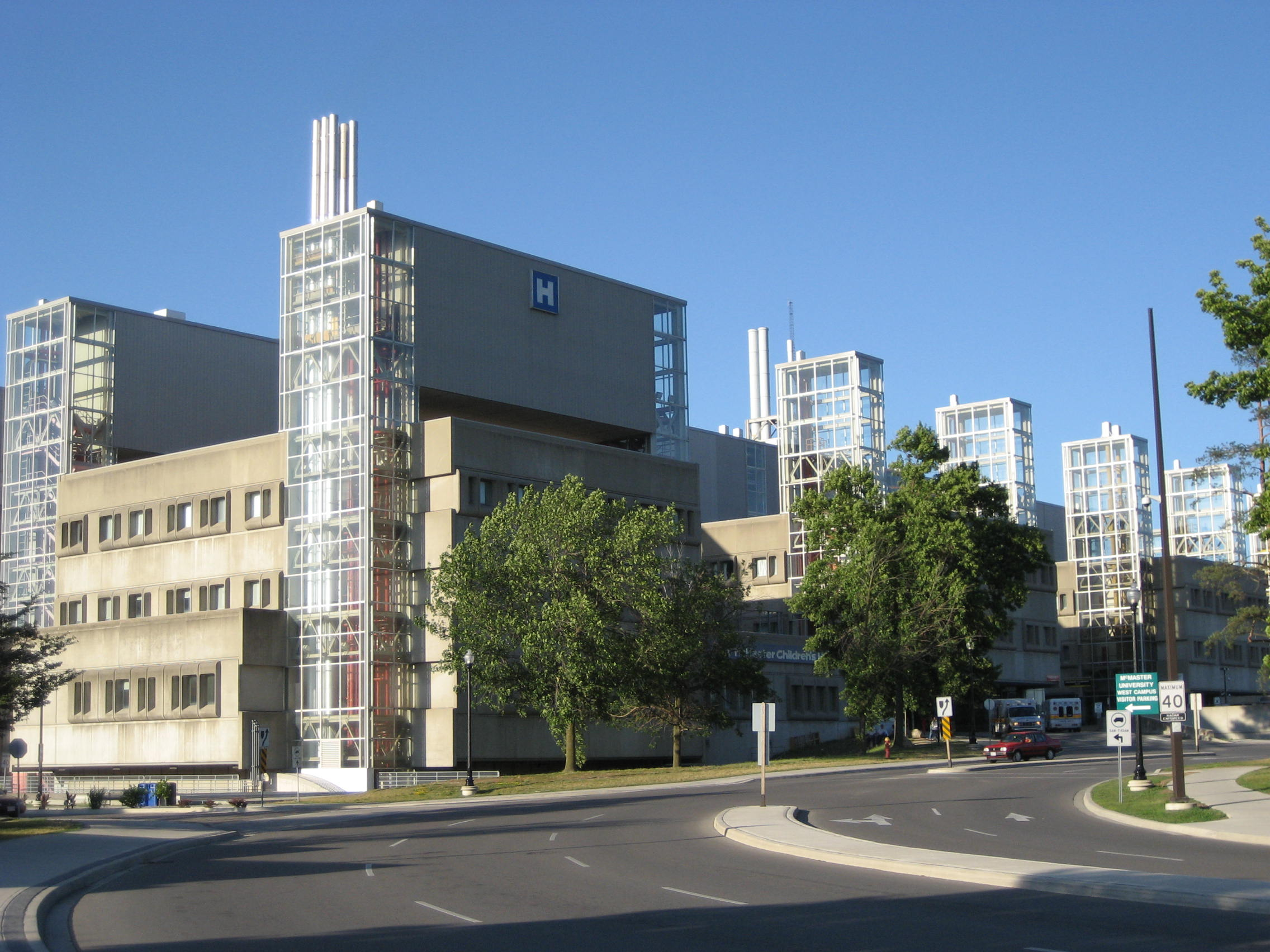

- Location within Ontario

Geography
- Location: Ontario, Canada
- Coordinates: 43.2594°N 79.9175°W

Organization
- Care system: Public Medicare (Canada) (OHIP)
- Type: Teaching, Specialist
- Affiliated university: McMaster University

Services
- Emergency department: Yes (pediatric)
- Beds: 365

Helipads
- Helipad: TC LID: CPJ3

History
- Founded: 1972

Links
- Website: https://www.hamiltonhealthsciences.ca/about-us/our-organization/our-locations/mcmaster-university-medical-centre/
- Lists: Hospitals in Canada

The McMaster University Medical Centre (MUMC) is a major Ontario hospital with three key services: McMaster Children's Hospital, Women's Health Centre and Adult Outpatient Services. It is a teaching hospital in Hamilton, Ontario, Canada. It is a part of McMaster University, but operated by Hamilton Health Sciences. The hospital network is ranked 2nd in Canada for research according to Research Infosource Inc.

McMaster University Medical Centre delivers a wide range of women's health services including high-risk obstetrics and gynecology to patients throughout the region. It also serves as the home for a range of adult outpatient clinics and day surgery. The site hosts one of Canada's premier digestive disease programs which, in conjunction with McMaster University, conducts more digestive disease research than any other program in the country.

== Overview ==
The McMaster University Medical Centre is the largest facility located at McMaster University. It is a multi-use research hospital that ranks among the largest public buildings in Canada. It is connected to the Life Sciences Building and the Michael DeGroote Centre for Learning & Discovery, which houses many well-funded research groups in areas of genetics, infectious diseases and several specific conditions.

MUMC is located on the same site as McMaster Children's Hospital (Mac Kids).

== Helipad ==
The McMaster Medical Center site is equipped with an offsite helipad for quicker patient transfer to the hospital. This Helipad was built to allow for quicker and safer transfers to hospitals.

== Architecture ==
The building itself is a brutalist structure designed by Eb Zeidler and opened in 1969. Controversial for its design and appropriation of Royal Botanical Gardens land, in 2014 the McMaster Medical Centre was designated a landmark by the Ontario Association of Architects.
