= McMaster School of Computational Engineering and Science =

Canadian research program

In 2005, the McMaster School of Computational Engineering and Science was the first program launched in Canada dedicated in developing expertise in the third wave of scientific research involving simulation, modeling and optimization. The new school brings together 50 faculty from engineering, science, business and health science to collaboratively conduct research and advance education.

The three major research thrusts of the school are:

- Computational Physical Sciences
- Computational Optimization, Design and Control
- Computational Biosciences

Activities cover a broad spectrum of research areas representing current interdisciplinary activities, future areas that involve existing, but as yet untapped potential, as well as areas to be developed by future appointments.

== Programs ==
The school offer programs at the Master, (M.Eng., M.Sc., M.A.Sc.) with coursework project or thesis. Ph.D. and postdoctoral levels. These will be of an interdisciplinary nature including core courses at the Masters level and module-based topic courses at all levels. Programs are currently being reviewed by the Ontario Council on Graduate Studies and approval is pending. Approval is anticipated in early 2006 with programs beginning in September.

== Facilities and Departmental Affiliations ==
McMaster University is a partner in the recently formed Shared Hierarchical Academic Research Computing Network (SHARCNET), currently among the leading high-performance computing centers in the world.

High-Performance Research Computing Support Group (HPRCS) – HPRCS supports HPC installations as a central part of the university infrastructure and provides various levels of computing support to the research and high-performance computing communities at McMaster.

=== Affiliated Laboratories ===
- Advanced Optimization Group and Laboratory
- Advanced Signal Processing Laboratory
- Applied and Industrial Mathematical Sciences Laboratory
- Bioinformatics Research Laboratory
- Communications Research Laboratory
- McMaster Advanced Control Consortium
- Neural Computation Laboratory
- Simulation Optimization Systems Research Laboratory

== Notes and references ==
1. Program Structure
