= McMaster Students Union =

- Institution: McMaster University
- Location: Hamilton, Ontario
- Established: 1890
- Members: 27,000
- Affiliations: OUSA
- Website: msumcmaster.ca

The McMaster Students Union (MSU) is the central undergraduate student government at McMaster University, in Hamilton, Ontario, Canada.

== History ==
The McMaster Student Body, the original student government, was formed in 1890 when McMaster University's official first registrants began their studies. In 1911, McMaster women, protesting gender inequality and not being allowed to vote in the general student body elections, elected a female representative student body and formed the Women's Student Body. In 1925, the number of day students began outnumbering the number of residence students. To ensure that both day and resident students were properly represented, the student government split in two bodies, the Student Body and the Residence Council. In 1946 the McMaster Student Body was renamed McMaster Students Union. In 1971 the MSU was incorporated as a non-profit organization without share capital under the Ontario Corporations Act.

The MSU's offices have been located in four buildings over time. They were first housed in the Alumni Memorial Building (opened in 1951 as the campus' first student centre), then Wentworth House (1961–74), Hamilton Hall (a former science building renovated to serve as a student centre, 1974–2002), and the McMaster University Student Centre (MUSC, 2002–present). Referendums in 1987 and 1989 approved a long-term levy that funded approximately two-thirds of the $36 million capital costs of the MUSC. Ground for the new building was broken in March 2000 and the official opening took place in September 2002. A student fee retired the remaining term loan in 2010–11.

== Scope ==
The MSU works to enhance both the academic and extracurricular experience of its members by offering a wide array of resources, services and opportunities to McMaster students and through advocacy of student issues with the university administration and relevant levels of government.

The MSU represents approximately 27,000 students, each of whom becomes a member of the students union when registering in a minimum of 18 units of undergraduate courses (three two-term courses, or equivalent) in an academic session. The university collects mandatory membership fees on the MSU’s behalf as a component of tuition/ancillary fees paid by students on registration. Fees, which are partially courseload-sensitive, are up to a maximum of $587.84 for the MSU, plus up to a further $760.71 in other university or student group supplementary fees which are approved by MSU referendums or General Assembly (2019–20 fee schedule).

== Governance ==
The MSU's constitution and bylaws establish the political apparatus of the union and its component organs, while a separate collection of operating policies define the functions of service-providing departments and the operating parameters of the organization.

The political leadership of the MSU is four officers — a president and three vice-presidents (Administration, Education and Finance). These positions are filled by students, typically after completing three or four years of study, who take a year off classes to work full-time in student government. The president is elected directly by the student body in annual elections traditionally held in early February, while the vice-presidents are elected by the Student Representative Assembly in early April. Slates and/or political parties, though commonplace at many other student unions, are not a typical feature of the MSU's political culture.

The MSU's chief legislative body is the Student Representative Assembly (SRA), a 35-member parliament comprising the president, vice-presidents, and 31 elected student representatives from nine academic divisions of the University (Arts & Science, Business, Engineering, Health Sciences, Kinesiology (separated from the Faculty of Science), Humanities, Nursing, Science, and Social Sciences). The SRA is the MSU's highest policy-setting body and has the sole authority to approve and modify legislation and elect officers other than the President.

The executive branch of government is the Executive Board (EB), which comprises the president, vice-presidents, and five SRA members-at-large; as well as the general manager, marketing & communications director, administrative services coordinator, and the associate: vice-president services. The board, chaired by the president, supervises the functioning of the union's services and bureaucracy and performs planning and priority-setting tasks in a manner somewhat akin to a Westminster-style cabinet. With the exception of the president, the EB's membership is elected by and responsible to the SRA. In emergency circumstances and during the summer months it can operate as an executive committee of the SRA and exercise the powers of the full assembly. Functional authority for full-time staff and the departments they supervise lies with the Corporate Board of Directors (see below) rather than the EB.

== Elections ==
MSU holds elections every year for the presidency and for the SRA positions. Elections are conducted using online voting. Voter turnout in presidential elections was above 40% from 2014 through 2017, but was 10.5% in 2023 and 16.4% in 2024.

== Corporate structure ==
The MSU was incorporated in 1971 as a corporation without share capital. For corporate purposes, including major financial decision-making and dealings with full-time staff members, the political organs of the union can reconvene in a corporate rather than political format—the Student Representative Assembly serves as the voting members of the corporation, with the four sabbatical officers assuming the role of a corporate board of directors. The board oversees day-to-day operations and an annual operating budget of over $13 million.

== Affiliated organizations ==
The MSU is a member of the Ontario Undergraduate Student Alliance (since 1998), and is a former member (and current observer) of the Canadian Alliance of Student Associations (2001–04 and 2009–14). From 1981 to 1998, MSU members were also members of the Canadian Federation of Students.

The MSU is also a current and founding member of the Undergraduates of Canadian Research Intensive Universities.

== Services ==
The MSU employs 36 permanent staff and over 200 part-time student staff. Its more than 30 operational departments include a restaurant-bar (TwelvEighty), professional production company (AVTEK Productions), Emergency First Response Team, First Year Council (FYC), Child Care Centre, convenience store (Union Market), print shop (Underground Media + Design), food bank (Food Collective Centre), newspaper (The Silhouette), radio station (93.3 CFMU-FM), Student Health Education Centre, and first-year transition program (MSU Spark).

== Alumni ==
In 1986, former MSU activists established the McMaster Students Union Alumni Association – the first student leader alumni association of its kind in Canada – as a branch of the McMaster University Alumni Association.

== See also ==
- List of Ontario students' associations
