= Nicholas E. Brathwaite =

Canadian educator

Nicholas Brathwaite

20th Chancellor of McMaster University
- Incumbent
- Assumed office January 1, 2026
- Preceded by: Santee Smith

Personal details
- Born: Carriacou, Grenada
- Relations: Nicholas Brathwaite
- Children: 3
- Education: McMaster University; University of Waterloo

Nicholas Brathwaite is a Grenadan-Canadian businessman who has served as the Chancellor of McMaster University since 2025. He holds degrees from McMaster University and the University of Waterloo in chemistry and polymer science, and has worked in silicon valley and financial technology. He is the inventor of over 60 patents.

== Honours ==
- Honorary doctorate from University of the West Indies (2014)
- Honorary doctorate from McMaster University (2018)
