= McMaster University =

Public university in Hamilton, Canada

- Coat of arms
- Motto: Τὰ πάντα ἐν Χριστῷ συνέστηκεν (Greek)
- Motto in English: In Christ all things consist
- Type: Public university
- Established: 23 April 1887 (139 years ago) (Note: McMaster University was formed in 1887 as a result of a merger between the Toronto Baptist College and Woodstock College's faculty of theology. Toronto Baptist College was established in 1881, while Woodstock College was established in 1857. From 1888, Woodstock College continued to operate as a male preparatory school not formally affiliated with McMaster.)
- Affiliations: ACU; COU; Fields Institute; IAU; U15; U21; Universities Canada
- Endowment: CA$1.04 billion
- Chancellor: Nicholas Brathwaite
- President: Susan Tighe
- Provost: Maureen J. MacDonald
- Faculty: 1,089
- Total staff: 17,141
- Students: 37,256 (2024–2025)
- Undergraduates: 31,779
- Postgraduates: 5,477
- Location: Hamilton, Ontario, Canada; 43°15′48″N 79°55′8″W
- Campus: Urban, 152.4 hectares (377 acres)
- Other campuses: Burlington; Kitchener; St. Catharines
- Colours: Maroon; gold; grey
- Nickname: Marauders
- Sporting affiliations: U Sports – OUA
- Mascot: Mac the Marauder
- Website: mcmaster.ca

McMaster University (McMaster or Mac) is a public research university in Hamilton, Ontario, Canada. The main McMaster campus is on 152.4 hectares (377 acres) of land near the residential neighbourhoods of Ainslie Wood and Westdale, adjacent to the Royal Botanical Gardens. It operates six academic faculties: the DeGroote School of Business and the faculties of Engineering, Health Sciences, Humanities, Social Science, and Science. It is a member of the U15, a group of research-intensive universities in Canada.

The university bears the name of William McMaster, a prominent Canadian senator and banker who bequeathed C$900,000 to its founding. It was incorporated under the terms of an act of the Legislative Assembly of Ontario in 1887, merging the Toronto Baptist College with Woodstock College's faculty of theology. It opened in Toronto in 1890. Inadequate facilities and the gift of land in Hamilton prompted its relocation in 1930. The Baptist Convention of Ontario and Quebec controlled the university until it became a privately chartered, publicly funded non-denominational institution in 1957.

As of November 1, 2024, McMaster University has 31,779 undergraduate and 5,477 post-graduate students. With over 253,049 alumni and former students residing across Canada, its athletic teams are known as the Marauders, and are members of U Sports. Notable alumni include government officials, academics, business leaders, Rhodes Scholars, Gates Cambridge Scholars, and Nobel laureates.

== History ==
McMaster University resulted from the outgrowth of educational initiatives undertaken by Baptists as early as the 1830s. The predecessor institution of McMaster was established in 1881 as Toronto Baptist College. Canadian Senator William McMaster, the first president of the Canadian Bank of Commerce, bequeathed funds to endow a university, which was incorporated through a merger of Toronto Baptist College and the faculty of theology in Woodstock College, Woodstock, Ontario. The merger was formalized in 1887 when the Act to unite Toronto Baptist College and Woodstock College was granted royal assent, with the newly incorporated institution being named McMaster University.

In 1887, the widow of William McMaster, Susan Moulton McMaster, conveyed a former family residence to the university for the purpose of establishing a preparatory school for girls. The Ladies' Department of Woodstock College transferred control of its Ladies' Department to the university, and the building was reopened as Moulton Ladies' College in 1888. The preparatory school operated until 1958, when it was closed by the university.

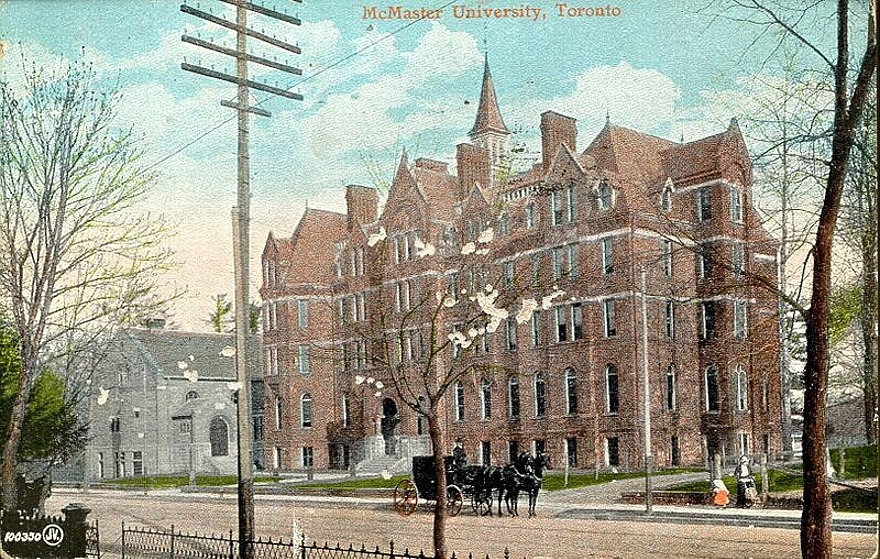
McMaster Hall, located in Toronto, was the original location of the university. The building is currently the headquarters of The Royal Conservatory of Music.

The new university, housed in McMaster Hall in Toronto, was sponsored by the Baptist Convention of Ontario and Quebec as an undergraduate institution for its clergy and adherents. The first courses—initially limited to arts and theology leading to a BA degree—were taught in 1890, and the first degrees were conferred in 1894.

As the university grew, McMaster Hall started to become overcrowded. The suggestion to move the university to Hamilton was first brought up by a student and Hamilton native in 1909, although the proposal was not seriously considered by the university until two years later. By the 1920s, after previous proposals between various university staff, the Hamilton Chamber of Commerce launched a campaign to bring McMaster University to Hamilton. As the issue of space at McMaster Hall became more acute, the university administration debated the future of the university. The university nearly became federated with the University of Toronto, as had been the case with Trinity College and Victoria College.

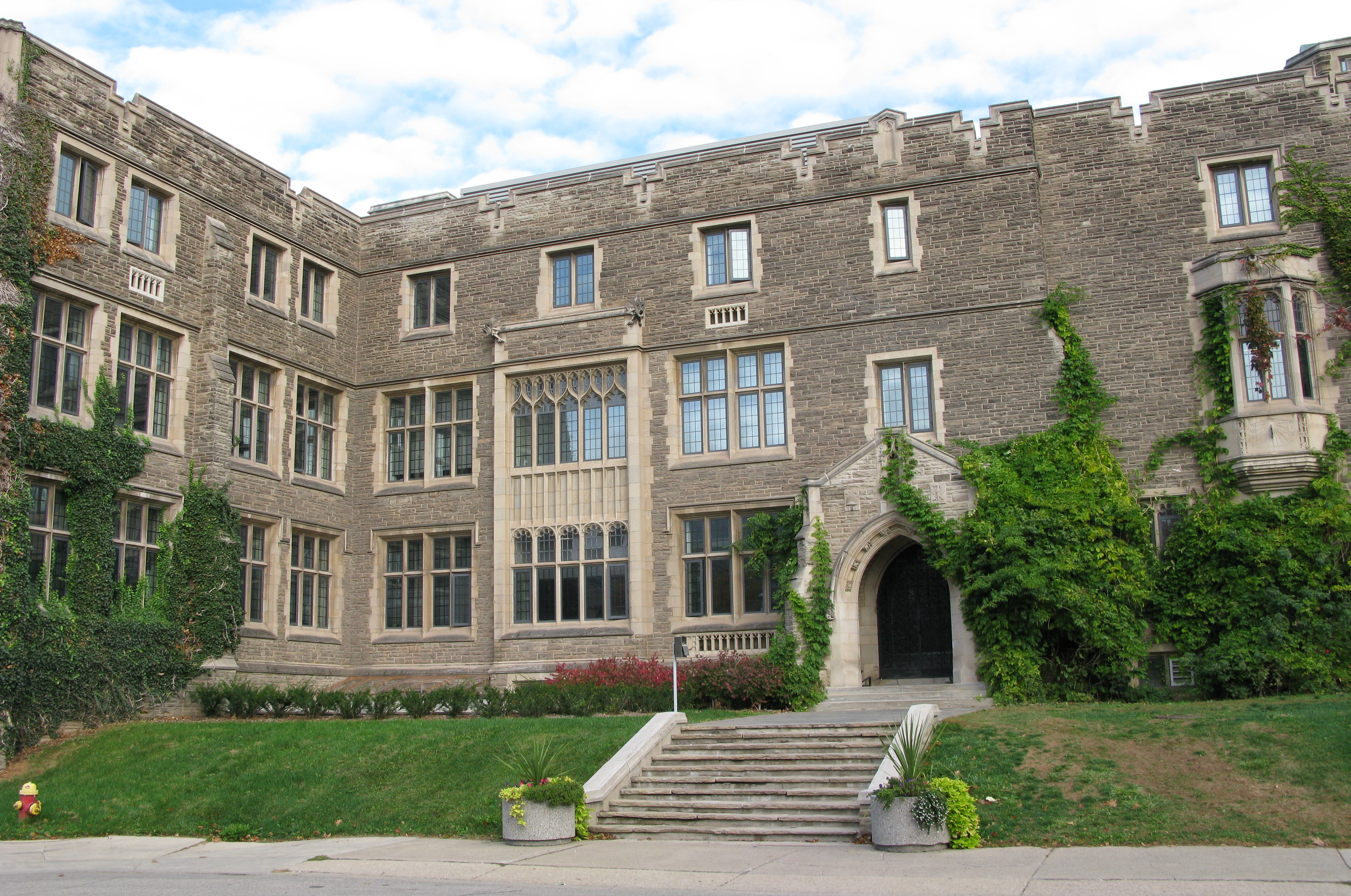
Hamilton Hall was constructed in 1926 in preparation for the university's move to Hamilton.

Instead, in 1927, the university administration decided to move the university to Hamilton. The Baptist Convention of Ontario and Quebec secured $1.5 million, while the citizens of Hamilton raised an additional $500,000 to help finance the move. The lands for the university and new buildings were secured through gifts from graduates. Lands were transferred from Royal Botanical Gardens to establish the campus area. The first academic session on the new Hamilton campus began in 1930. McMaster's property in Toronto was sold to the University of Toronto when McMaster moved to Hamilton in 1930. McMaster Hall is now home to the Royal Conservatory of Music.

Professional programs during the interwar period were limited to just theology and nursing. By the 1940s the McMaster administration was under pressure to modernize and expand the university's programs. During the Second World War and post-war periods the demand for technological expertise, particularly in the sciences, increased. This problem placed a strain on the finances of what was still a denominational Baptist institution. In particular, the institution could no longer secure sufficient funds from denominational sources alone to sustain science research. Since denominational institutions could not receive public funds, the Baptist Convention of Ontario and Quebec decided to reorganize the university, creating two federated colleges. The arts and divinity programs were reconstituted as University College and science was reorganized under the newly incorporated Hamilton College as a separate division capable of receiving provincial grants. Hamilton College was incorporated in 1948 by letters patent under The Companies Act, although it remained only affiliated with the university. The university traditionally focused on undergraduate studies, and did not offer a PhD program until 1949.

Through the 1950s increased funding advanced the place of sciences within the institution. In 1950, the university had completed the construction of three academic buildings for the sciences, all designed by local architect William Russell Souter. Public funding was eventually necessary to ensure the humanities and social sciences were given an equal place. Thus, in 1957 the university reorganized once again under The McMaster University Act, 1957, dissolving the two colleges. Its property was vested to McMaster and the university became a nondenominational institution eligible for public funding. The historic Baptist connection was continued through McMaster Divinity College, a separately chartered affiliated college of the university. Also in 1957, PhD programs were consolidated in a new Faculty of Graduate Studies. Construction of the McMaster Nuclear Reactor also began in 1957, and was the first university-based research reactor in the Commonwealth when it began operating in 1959.

In 1965, with the support of the Ontario government, the university established a medical school and teaching hospital, graduating its first class of physicians in 1972. In 1968 the university was reorganized under an amended act of the McMaster Act into the Divisions of Arts, Science, and Health Sciences, each with its own vice-president, while the Divinity College continued under its existing arrangement. In 1974 the divisional structure of the university was dissolved and reorganized again under The McMaster University Act, 1976 and the vice-presidents were replaced by a single vice-president (academic). The Faculties of Business, Engineering, Health Sciences, Humanities, Science, and Social Sciences were retained, each under the leadership of a dean.

== Campus ==
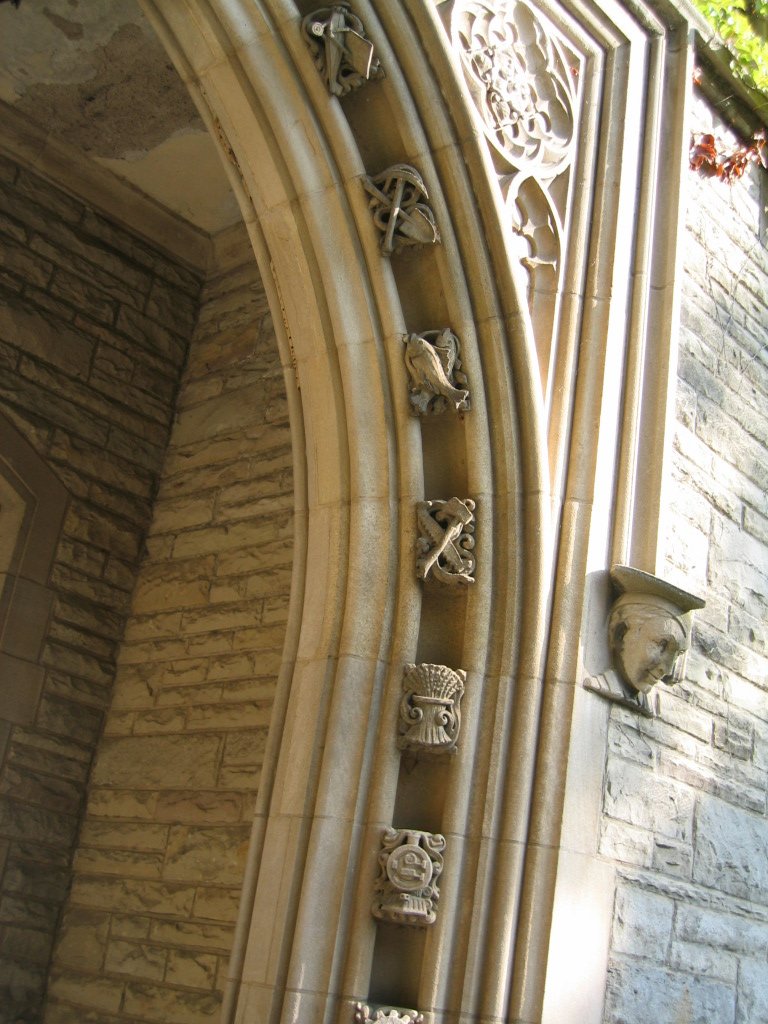
McMaster's oldest buildings are examples of Collegiate Gothic architecture, with architectural elements such as carved ornamentation, bas-reliefs, recessed arched entryways, and ashlar found throughout these buildings.

McMaster University is in the city of Hamilton, Ontario, in the Golden Horseshoe along the western end of Lake Ontario. The main campus is bordered to the north by Cootes Paradise, an extensive natural marshland; to the east and west by residential neighbourhoods; and to its south by Main Street West, a major transportation artery. Its northern boundaries are a popular destination for walkers who use the many trails that connect the campus to Royal Botanical Gardens. While the main campus is 152.4 hectares (377 acres), most of the teaching facilities are within the core 12.1 hectares (30 acres). In addition to its main campus in Hamilton, McMaster owns several other properties around Hamilton as well as in Burlington, Kitchener, and St. Catharines, Ontario.

In 2017, the university owned and managed 58 buildings, including both on and off campus housing. The buildings at McMaster vary in age—from Hamilton Hall which opened in 1926, to the university's new Bertrand Russell Archives and Research Centre, which opened 25 June 2018. Recent developments include the 10 Bay graduate residence (opened 2023, 640 beds), the McLean Centre for Collaborative Discovery (occupancy Fall 2025), and a new greenhouse in front of the Life Sciences Building (2025). McMaster's main campus is divided into three main areas: the Core Campus, North Campus and West Campus. The Core Campus has most of the university's academic, research and residential buildings, while the North Campus is made up of the university's athletic precinct and a small amount of surface parking. The West Campus is the least developed area of the main campus, containing only a few buildings, surface parking, and undeveloped land. A 2024 master plan emphasizes more green, pedestrian-friendly spaces and improved accessibility. Security at the university is provided by special constables employed by McMaster University Security Service, a department of the university.

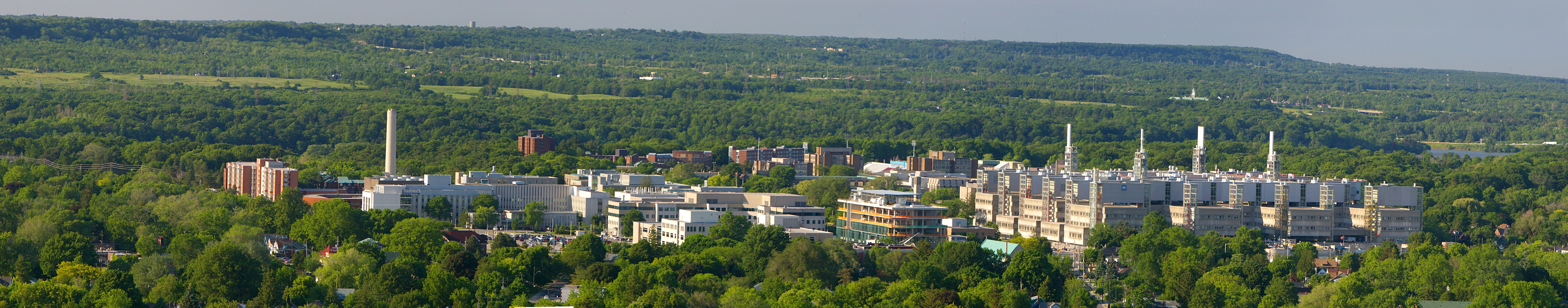
Panoramic view of McMaster University's main campus from the southwest, taken in June 2008. This campus has the majority of the university's facilities.

=== Academic facilities ===
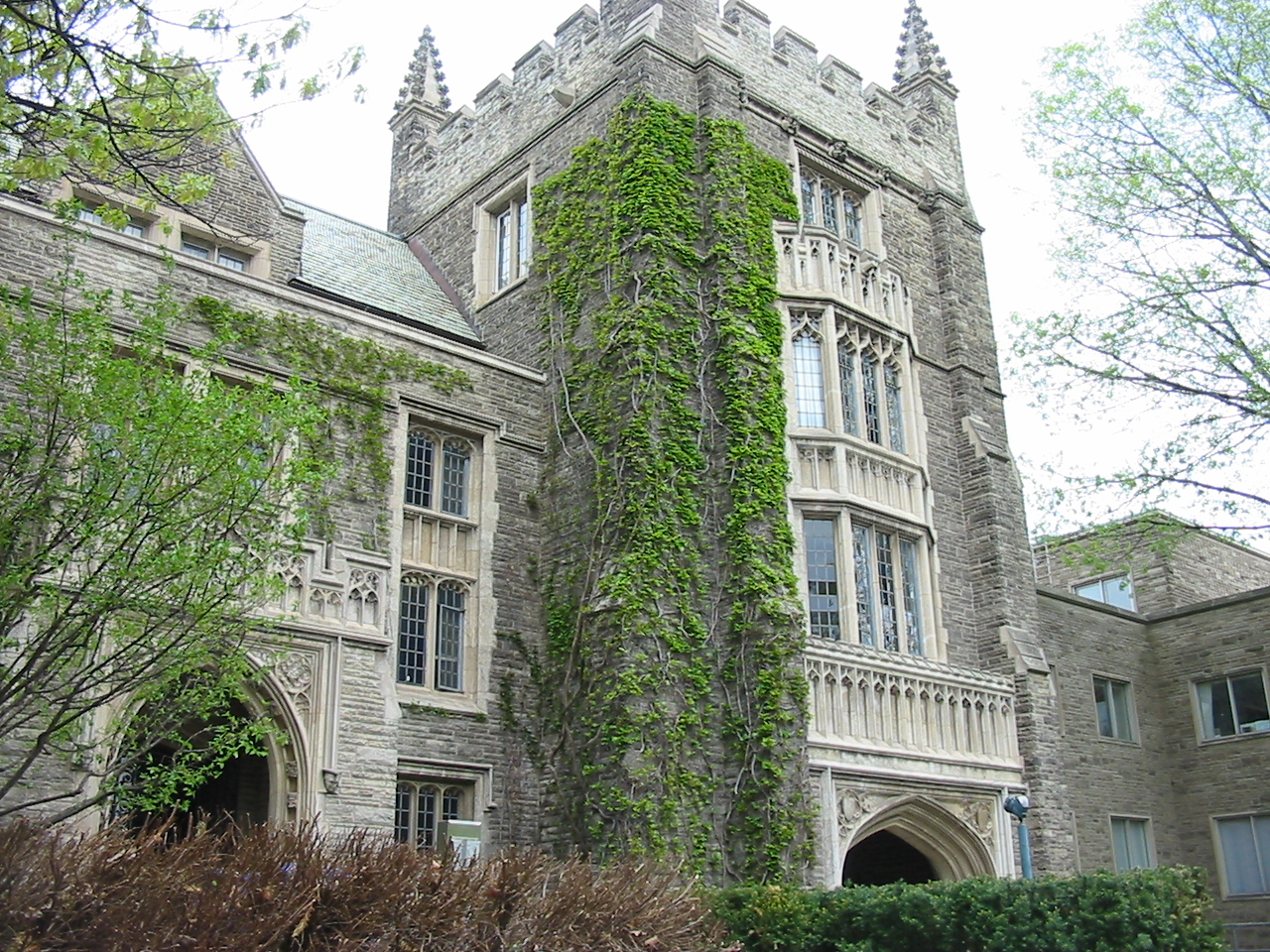
University Hall is one of the oldest facilities still used by the university.

The university's campus has gone through continuous development since 1928. The main campus's six original buildings are of Collegiate Gothic architecture, designed by William Lyon Somerville, who also laid out the initial campus plan. They are now flanked by over fifty structures built predominantly from the 1940s to 1960s. The largest facility is the McMaster University Medical Centre, a multi-use research hospital that is home to the largest neonatal intensive care unit and the third-largest child and youth mental health unit in Canada. It is connected to the Life Sciences building and the Michael DeGroote Centre for Learning & Discovery, which houses many well-funded research groups in areas of genetics, infectious diseases, and several specific conditions.

The McMaster Nuclear Reactor (MNR) has been the largest university reactor in the Commonwealth since it began operation and is the second largest research reactor in North America. It is a "pool-type" reactor with a core of enriched uranium fuel moderated and cooled by distilled water. While the MNR's primary purpose is research and the production of medical isotopes, the MNR serves students in nuclear engineering, medical and health physics, and other applied radiation sciences. The university provides a wide range of irradiation, laboratory, and holding facilities, which include a cyclotron, an accelerator, a small-angle neutron-scattering detector, and wide-angle neutron scattering facilities. The cyclotron is used for the production of fluorine-18, and is used for research purposes, particularly the development of novel molecular imaging agents.

=== Library and museum ===
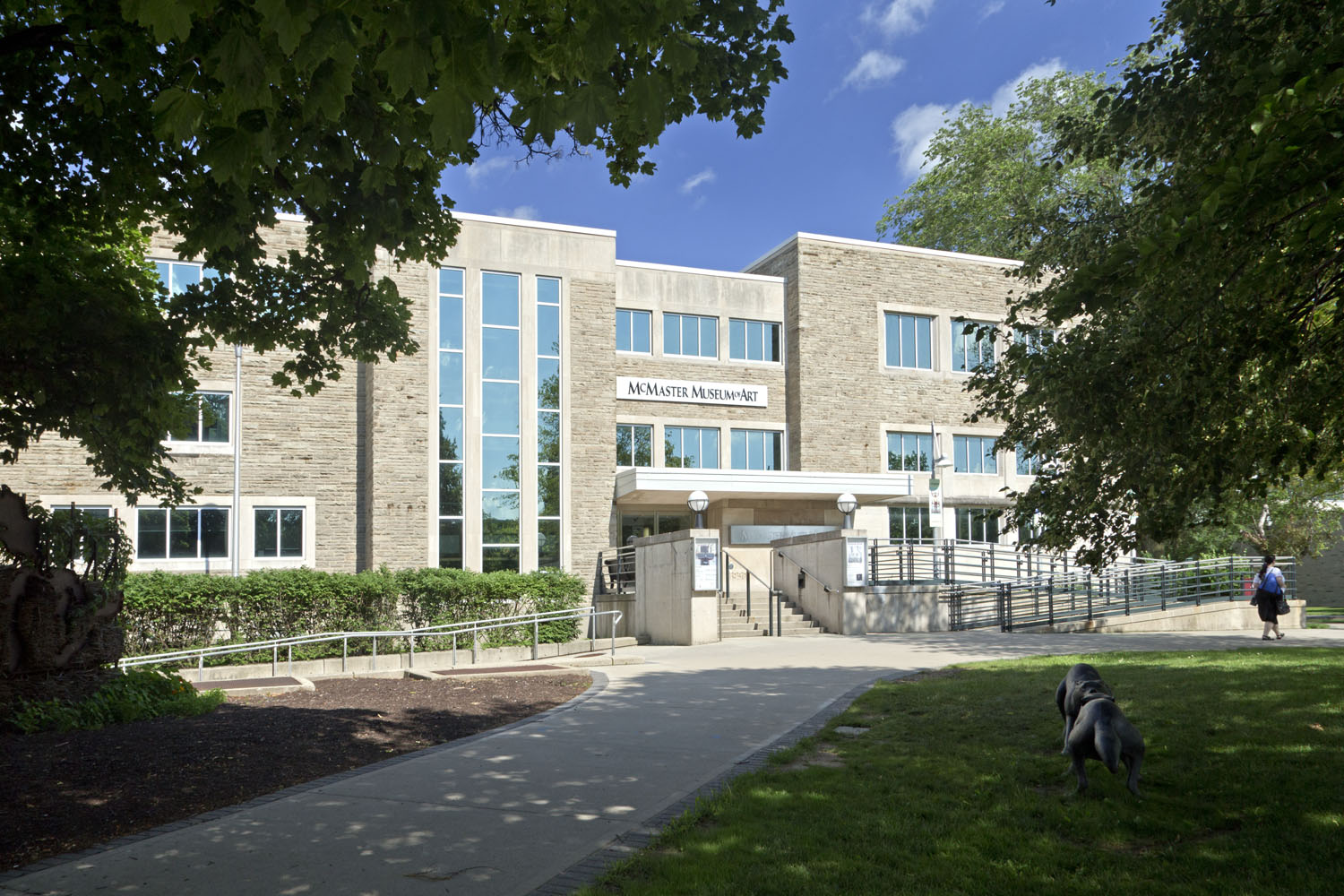
The McMaster Museum of Art holds the highest attendance figures for a university-affiliated museum in Canada.

The university's library system is a member of 31 organizations, including the Association of Research Libraries. Around 2.8 million articles were downloaded from the library system's electronic journal collection during the 2016 academic year. The university library employs 138 professional, and support staff. The library's resource expenditure for the 2016–2017 academic year was approximately $11.5 million, with 81 per cent of the budget allocated to serial and e-resource subscriptions, 9 per cent on hard copy acquisitions, and 10 per cent to membership and collections support. The library system include four libraries housing 1,274,265 paper books and 3,689,973 total resources, including videos, maps, sound recordings, and microfilm. Mills Library houses the humanities and social sciences collections, with a wide range of print and digital resources. Innis Library houses content which supports the academic and research interests of the DeGroote School of Business. Thode Library houses academic material of various disciplines of science and engineering, while the Health Science Library houses books pertaining to medical sciences. The William Ready Division of Archives and Research Collections at McMaster University consist of papers of Canadian publishers; British personalities and of Canadian literary figures such as Farley Mowat, Pierre Berton, Matt Cohen, and Marian Engel. It includes the archives of Bertrand Russell, and of labour unions.

The McMaster Museum of Art's (MMA) principal role is to support the academic mission of McMaster University and to contribute to the discourse on art in Canada. The museum has the highest attendance figures for a university-affiliated museum in Canada, with 30,000 visitors in 2016. Established in 1967, the museum houses and exhibits the university's art collection. As of 2015, that collection of 5,971 pieces holds a value of $98.7 million. The collection includes works by Gustave Courbet, Claude Monet, Camille Pissarro, Walter Sickert and Vincent van Gogh. The museum also boasts the most comprehensive collection of German expressionist and Weimar period prints in Canada.

=== Housing and student facilities ===
As of August 2026, McMaster has fourteen smoke-free student residences: Bates Residence, Brandon Hall, Edwards Hall, Hedden Hall, Les Prince Hall, Lincoln Alexander Hall, Mary E. Keyes Residence, Matthews Hall, McKay Hall, Moulton Hall, Peter George Centre for Living and Learning, Wallingford Hall, Whidden Hall, and Woodstock Hall. McMaster's student residences can accommodate 4,186 students. ^{]} The latest residence to be built was Lincoln Alexander Hall (LAH), which was completed in Summer 2026. LAH can house 1,365 students. The second latest residence to be built was Peter George Centre for Living and Learning (PGCLL), which was completed in Fall 2019. PGCLL can house 500 students and also contains lecture halls, tutorial rooms, and eateries. Les Prince Hall, the second-latest residence to be completed and a large co-ed building, opened in 2006. It was named for a long-time hall master in the residence system who lived with his family on campus until after his retirement in 1980. In September 2010, 50.19 per cent of first-year students lived on campus, with 15.54 per cent of the overall undergraduate population living on campus.

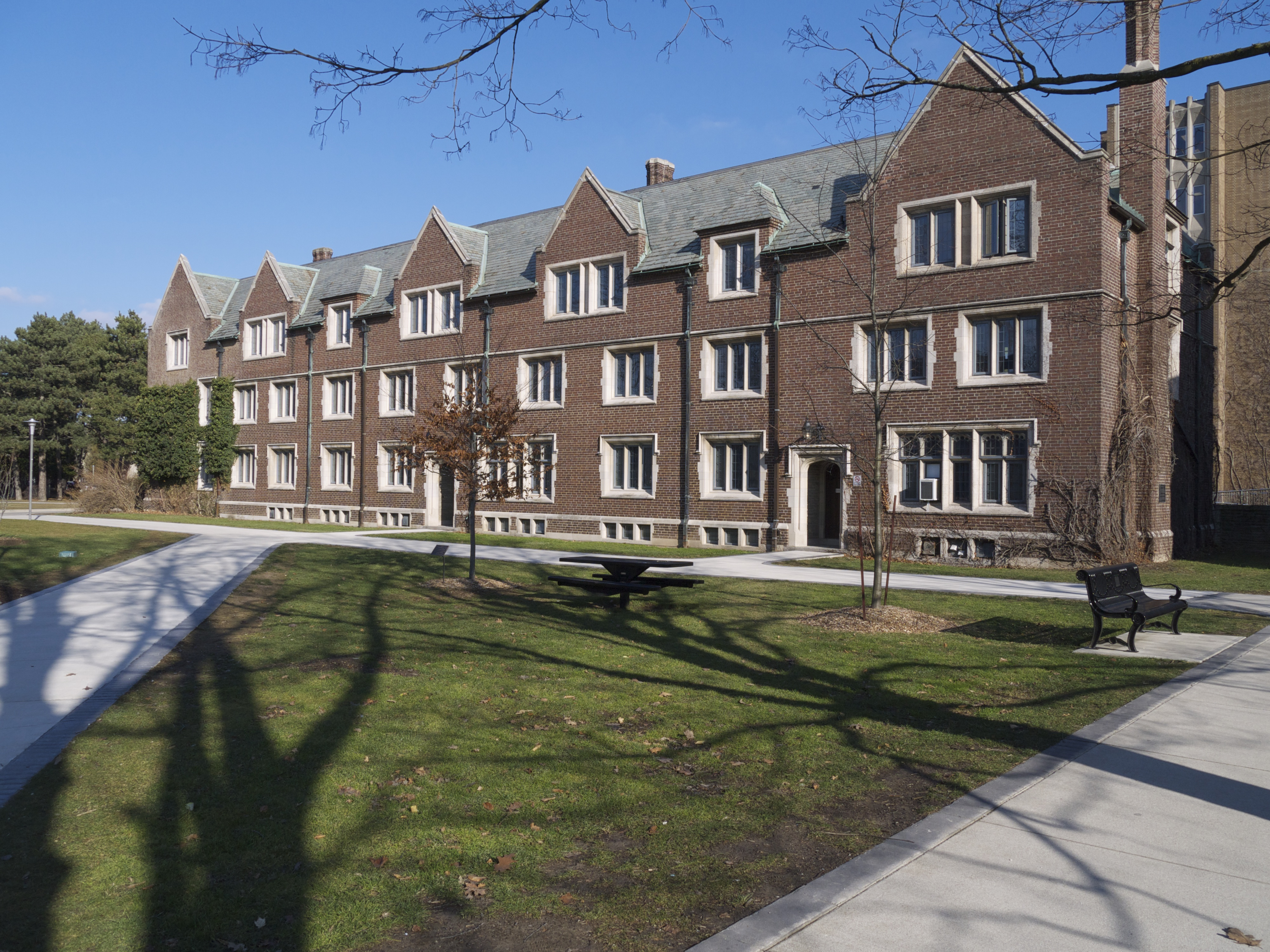
Edwards Hall is one of twelve student residences on the main campus.

Residences provide traditional room and board style, furnished apartment style, and suite-style accommodation. Brandon Hall houses the university's substance-free lifestyle living spaces. The residence system is supervised by Residence Life staff, who provide guidance and help the transition to university life for many first-year students.

The McMaster University Student Centre (MUSC) is the centre of student life and programming. It has a café, study space, common areas, and several administrative departments, including the CIBC Conference Hall. The MUSC contains the offices of a number of student organizations, including the McMaster Students Union and The Silhouette weekly newspaper as well as other services such as the Campus Health Centre and the campus dentist. The university has over twenty dining outlets throughout the campus, including two major residence dining facilities. The university has several vegetarian establishments, such as a completely vegetarian cafe known as Bridges Café and a farmers market stand. The university was voted as the country's most vegan-friendly university through People for the Ethical Treatment of Animals (PETA) for a number of years. Several other dining outlets at McMaster have garnered awards throughout the years for food services.

=== Off-campus facilities ===
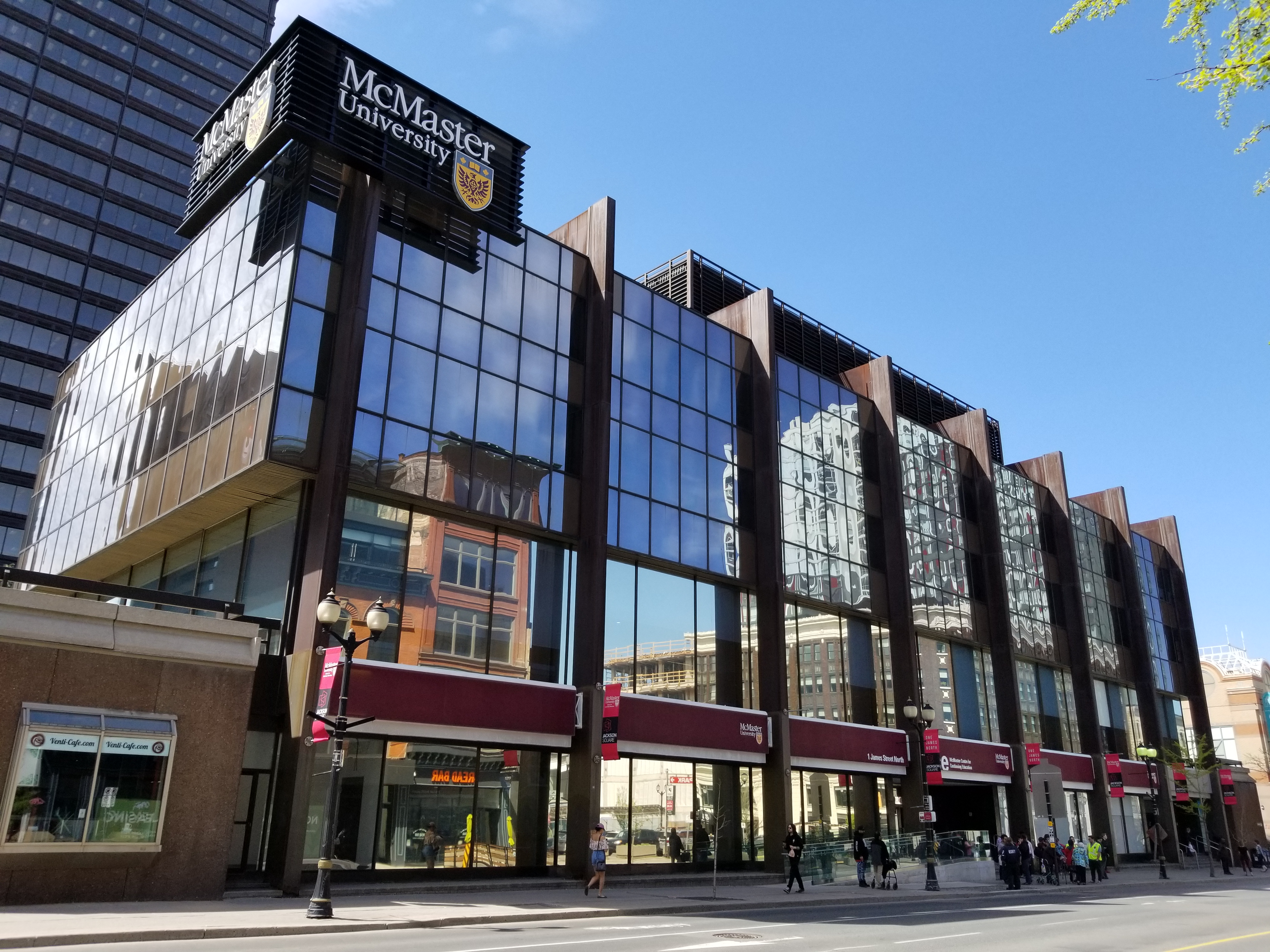
The former Bank of Montreal Pavilion in downtown Hamilton is home to the Centre for Continuing Education.

As of 2010 McMaster University's DeGroote School of Business operates a 1.82-hectare (4.5-acre) site in the neighbouring city of Burlington. Consideration for the new building began in 2004, when McMaster University had announced its initial intent to construct a new arts- and technology-intensive campus in partnership with the city of Burlington. In 2009, the City of Burlington, Halton Region, and McMaster University signed an official agreement laying out the timelines and next steps for the university's expansion into Burlington. Construction began on 17 June 2009, and the official opening was on 7 October 2010. The four-story, 8,400-square-metre (90,000 sq ft) building is called the Ron Joyce Centre. The Ron Joyce Centre is home to DeGroote's MBA program and its business management program (both degree and non-degree programs).

McMaster has several administrative offices at its Downtown Centre. The McMaster Centre for Continuing Education, which offers certificate and diploma programs as well as personal and professional development programs, is within the former Bank of Montreal Pavilion at Lloyd D. Jackson Square. McMaster had also announced construction of the McMaster Downtown Health Campus in downtown Hamilton had begun in December 2012. The Health Campus is expected to provide teaching spaces, exam rooms and clinical spaces for local residents.

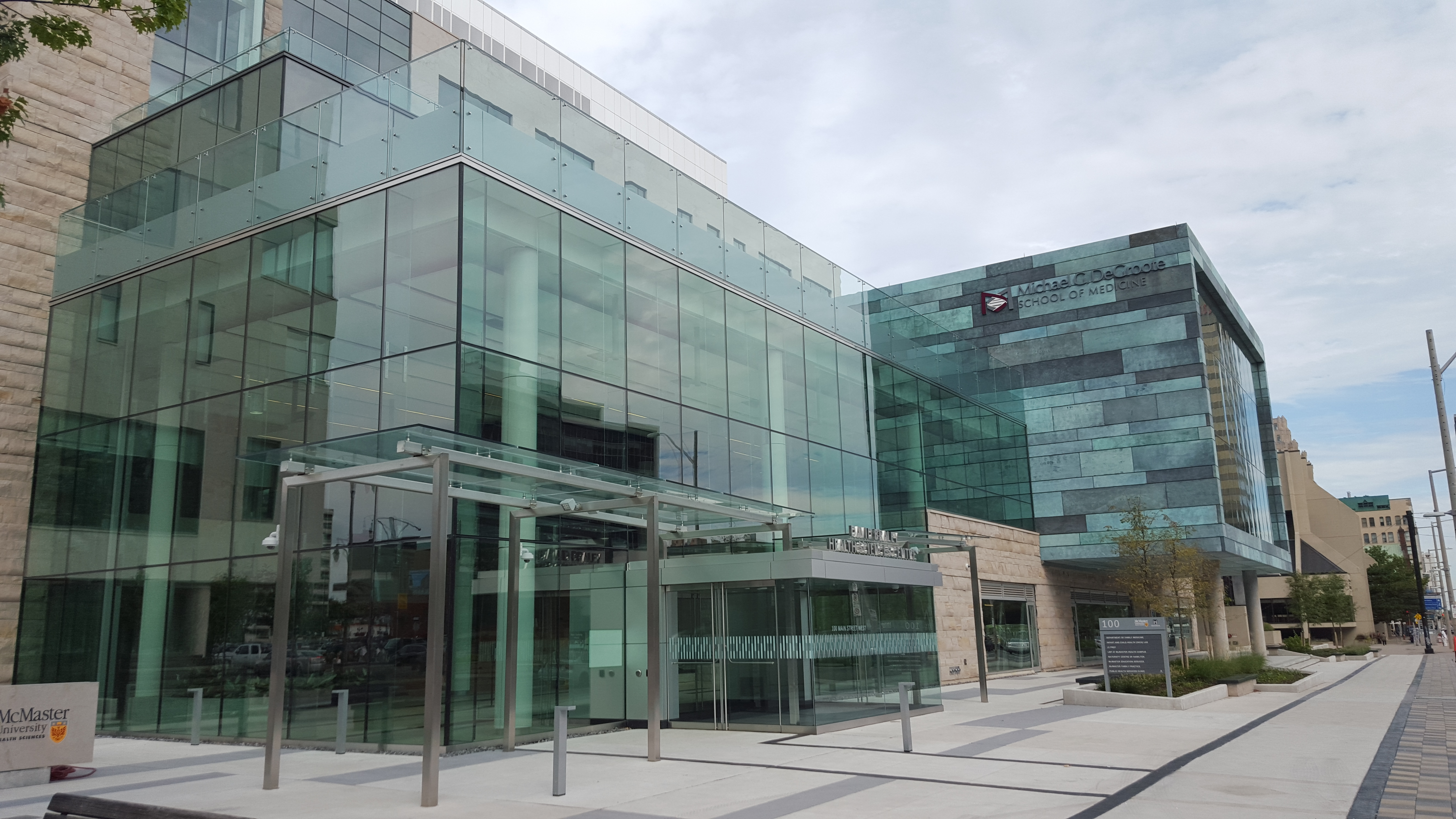
The David Braley Health Sciences Centre at the McMaster Health Campus in downtown Hamilton

The Michael G. DeGroote School of Medicine is on the main campus as well as in two regional campuses at St. Catharines and Kitchener. The Waterloo Regional Campus is in downtown Kitchener, where it shares facilities with the Health Sciences Campus of the University of Waterloo. The campus in St. Catharines is at Brock University's Niagara Health and Bioscience Research Complex. Approximately 30 medical students in each year of the program attend each campus. Those who apply to McMaster's School of Medicine are asked to rank their site choice (Hamilton, Niagara Region, Waterloo Region) from first to third, or no preference. Offers of admission to the medical school are made from a rank list irrespective of geographical preference. Subsequent to an applicant's acceptance, registrants to the class are placed based on their preference and geographical background. The offers given out by McMaster are bound to the assigned site.

McMaster purchased a large industrial park three kilometres east of its main Hamilton campus in 2005 with the intention of creating an array of research facilities for the development of advanced manufacturing and materials, biotechnology, automotive, and nanotechnology. In July 2005 the federal government announced it would relocate CANMET, a federal government materials research laboratory, from its Ottawa centre to Hamilton. This decision helped spearhead the development of the McMaster Innovation Park. The United Nations University-International Network on Water, Environment and Health (UNU-INWEH) is headquartered within the park. UNU-INWEH is the only United Nations agency headquartered in Ontario and the only North American host site for a United Nations University, after moving to McMaster Innovation Park on 23 April 2008.

=== Sustainability ===
The Office of Sustainability, created as the All-modes Commuting & Transportation Office in 2002, is charged with promoting sustainable operations and growth at the university. The Office of Sustainability, headed by the Manager of University Sustainability, works with various members of the university population, external community groups, and the government. Along with the other members of the Council of Ontario Universities, McMaster signed a pledge in 2009 known as Ontario Universities Committed to a Greener World, with the objective of transforming its campus into a model of environmental responsibility. On 21 October 2010, the university signed two accords addressing the issue of climate change: the Talloires Declaration and the University and College Presidents' Climate Change Statement of Action for Canada.

The university campus received a B grade from the Sustainable Endowments Institute on its College Sustainability Report Card for 2011.

== Administration ==
The governance of the university is conducted through the board of governors and the senate, both of which were established in the Act to unite Toronto Baptist College and Woodstock College in 1887. The board is responsible for the university's conduct, management, and control of the university and of its property, revenues, business, and affairs. Ex officio governors of the Board include the university's chancellor, president, and the chairman of the board-senate committee on long-range planning. The Board also consists of 34 other governors, either appointed or elected by the various members of the university's community, including elected representatives from the student body. While The McMaster University Act, 1976 outlines that the board be only composed of 37 members, the Board also includes 12 honorary members, bringing the total number of governors to 51.

The senate is responsible for the university's academics, including standards for admission into the university and qualifications for degrees, diplomas, and certificates. The senate consists of 15 ex officio positions granted to the chancellor, the president, the vice-presidents of the university, the senior dean of each faculty, the dean of graduate studies, the dean of adult education, the principal of McMaster Divinity College, and the chairman of the Undergraduate Council. The senate also consists of 51 other members, appointed or elected by the various communities of the university, including elected representatives of the student body. Meetings of the board of governors and the senate are open to the public.

The president acts as the chief executive officer of the university under the authority of the board and the senate, and supervises and directs the academic and administrative work of the university and of its teaching and non-teaching staff. The office was created in 1949, with George Gilmour serving as the university's first president. The office of the vice-chancellor, created at the same time as the office of president, has always been held by the incumbent president of the university. The current president, Susan Tighe, was appointed on July 1, 2025, becoming McMaster's 9th president and vice-chancellor and the first engineer to serve as president.

The appointment of Dr. Tighe was unanimously approved by the Committee for Recommending a President, which was followed by approval of the university's Senate and Board of Governors.

=== Affiliated institution ===
McMaster University is affiliated with one post-secondary institution, McMaster Divinity College. The seminary is within the campus of the university. As an affiliated institution, two members of the Divinity College sit on the university's senate, as well as appoint one representative to sit in the university's board of governors. However, the Divinity College operates with its own senate and board of trustees. Although Divinity College has the authority to confer their own degrees, students taking the college's Master of Divinity and Master of Theological Studies are awarded degrees by McMaster University. Students of Divinity College have access to the catalogue of McMaster University Library, while students of the university similarly have access to the Canadian Baptist Archives, managed by the university's library system.

The university and the divinity college were incorporated as the same institution in 1887, a result of a merger between two Baptist institutions, the Canadian Literary Institute in Woodstock, Ontario, and Toronto Baptist College. McMaster University continued to operate as a Baptist-run institution until 1957, when provincial legislation allowed for the governance of the university to pass from the Baptist Convention of Ontario and Quebec, to a privately chartered, publicly funded arrangement. McMaster's Faculty of Theology was spun-off into McMaster Divinity College, a separately-chartered affiliated college of the university.

From 1911 to 1938, Brandon College (reincorporated as Brandon University in 1967) was an affiliated institution of McMaster. Located in Brandon, Manitoba, the affiliated institution was funded by the Baptist Union of Western Canada. The college ended its affiliation with McMaster in 1938, after Brandon College became a non-denominational institution.

=== Finances ===
McMaster's fiscal year ends on April 30. The net assets owned by the university as of 6 June 2024 stands at C$2,058.7 million. The university had completed the 2024–2025 year with revenues of C$1,400.3 million, expenses of $1,367.7 million, for an excess in revenue of $32.6 million. McMaster's revenue comes from endowment income, gifts, fees, and annual grants from the City of Hamilton, the Province of Ontario, and the Government of Canada. In the 2024-25 academic year, the largest source of revenue for the university was tuition fees, followed by operating grants provided by the government. As of 30 April 2023, McMaster's external financial endowment was valued at C$589.4 million. The financing of McMaster's scholarships and bursaries takes up 40 per cent of the endowments received. Financial Services comprises the following areas: Student Accounts & Cashiers, Financial Accounting and Reporting, and Budgeting Services.

The university has been registered as an educational charitable organization in Canada since 1 January 1967. As of 2011, the university is registered primarily as a post-secondary institution, with 70 per cent of the charity dedicated to the management and maintenance of the university. The remaining 30 per cent has been dedicated under research.

== Academics ==
Current faculties of McMaster University
Faculties	Established
DeGroote School of Business	1952
Faculty of Engineering	1958
Faculty of Health Sciences	1974
Faculty of Humanities	1887
Faculty of Science	1887
Faculty of Social Sciences	1887

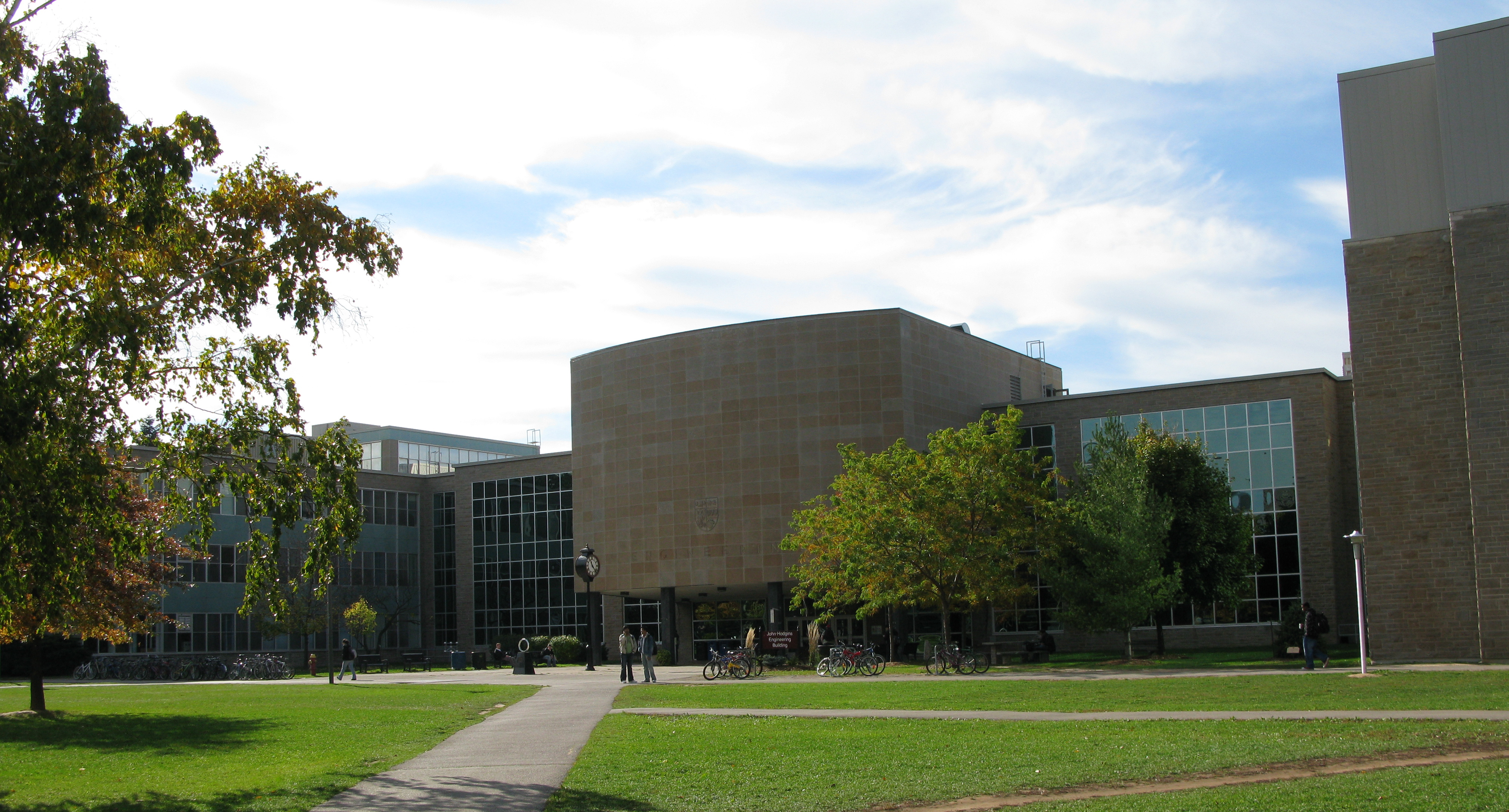
The John Hodgins Building houses several facilities for the university's Faculty of Engineering.

McMaster is a publicly funded research university, and a member of the Universities Canada. McMaster functions on a semester system, operating year-round on academic semesters, fall/winter and spring/summer. In the 2023–2024 academic year, the university had an enrolment of 37,592 students; 32,105 undergraduate students, 5,487 graduate students. Programs, departments, and schools at McMaster are divided among six faculties, the DeGroote School of Business, the Faculty of Health Sciences, the Faculty of Humanities, the Faculty of Engineering, the Faculty of Science, and the Faculty of Social Sciences.

By undergraduate enrolment in 2023-2024, McMaster's largest faculty was the Faculty of Science, with 8,319 full-time equivalent students. The Faculty of Humanities was the smallest, with 2,026. The Faculty of Health Sciences holds the highest graduate enrolment, with 1,144 graduate students. A number of university students are enrolled in interdisciplinary programs, administered by two or more faculties, including 549 graduate students. At the undergraduate level, the Arts and Science program is taught jointly by the six faculties at McMaster. Created in 1981, the program aims to provide a broad-based, liberal education, providing substantial work in both the arts and sciences. In 2023-2024, 292 undergraduate students were enrolled in the Arts and Science program.

The university also jointly administers several undergraduate collaborative programs with Mohawk College, in which approximately 3,019 students were enrolled in 2023-2024. The university also awards degrees to graduate students of McMaster Divinity College. The Divinity College was originally the university's Faculty of Theology, before it was reorganized into a separately chartered, affiliated college of the university in 1957.

Students may apply for financial aid such as the Ontario Student Assistance Program and Canada Student Loans and Grants through the federal and provincial governments. The financial aid provided may come in the form of loans, grants, bursaries, scholarships, fellowships, debt reduction, interest relief, and work programs. In 2022–2023, McMaster students received approximately C$145.8 million in Ontario Student Assistance Program aid (loans C$88.2 million, grants C$57.6 million). In 2023–2024, students received C$13.7 million in bursaries.

The university international student exchange agreements with over 100 universities outside Canada, enabling its students to earn credits while studying abroad.

=== McMaster Model ===
The McMaster Model is the university's policy for a student-centred, problem-based, interdisciplinary approach to learning. During the 1960s the McMaster University Medical School pioneered problem-based learning (PBL) tutorials that have since been adopted by other fields in the Faculty of Health Science, as well as other faculties and programs in the university. The PBL tutorial model has since been adopted into the curriculums of other medical schools in Canada, and more than 80 per cent of medical schools in the United States.

In 1991, McMaster's School of Medicine adopted progress testing, developing the personal progress index (PPI), a system based on progress testing invented concurrently by the University of Missouri-Kansas City's medical school and the Maastricht University. The PPI is used as an objective method for assessing acquisition and retention of knowledge for students in the medical program. The PPI is administered at regular intervals to all students in the program, regardless of their level of training, and plots students' scores as they move through the program. Students typically score 20 per cent on their first examination, and increase by five to seven per cent with each successive examination. Students can monitor the changes in their scores and receive formative feedback based on a standardized score relative to the class mean. Due to the overwhelming success and research supporting the use of the PPI as an evaluation tool, it is now used in Canada, US, Europe, and Australia.

=== Rankings and reputation ===
University rankings

World rankings
- ARWU World: 101–150
- QS World: =173
- THE World: =116
- USNWR World: =127
- 4–5

Canadian rankings
- QS National: 8
- THE National: =4
- USNWR National: 4
- Maclean's Medical/Doctoral: 4

McMaster University has placed in post-secondary school rankings. In the 2024 Academic Ranking of World Universities rankings, the university ranked 101-150th in the world and 4-5th in Canada. The 2025 QS World University Rankings ranked the university 173th in the world and 8th in Canada. The 2025 Times Higher Education World University Rankings placed McMaster 116th in the world, and 4th in Canada. In U.S. News & World Report 2025-26 global university rankings, the university placed 146th, and 4th in Canada. In 2011, Newsweek had also ranked McMaster as the 15th top university outside of the United States, and the fourth best university in Canada. In Maclean's 2025 rankings, McMaster placed fourth in their Medical-Doctoral university category, and fifth in their reputation survey for Canadian universities. McMaster was ranked in spite of having opted out from participation in Maclean's graduate survey since 2006.

McMaster also placed in a number of rankings that evaluated the employment prospects of graduates. In QS's 2022 graduate employability ranking, the university ranked 81st in the world, and fourth in Canada. In the Times Higher Education's 2022 global employability ranking, McMaster placed 81st in the world, and fifth in Canada.> In an employability survey published by The New York Times in October 2011, when CEOs and chairmen were asked to select the top universities which they recruited from, McMaster placed 61st in the world, and fourth in Canada.

As of 2024, several of McMaster's health science areas rank in the Top 5 in Canada and Top 100 globally, including Clinical Medicine (2nd in Canada and 17th globally) and Endocrinology and Metabolism (2nd in Canada and 36th globally).

=== Research ===
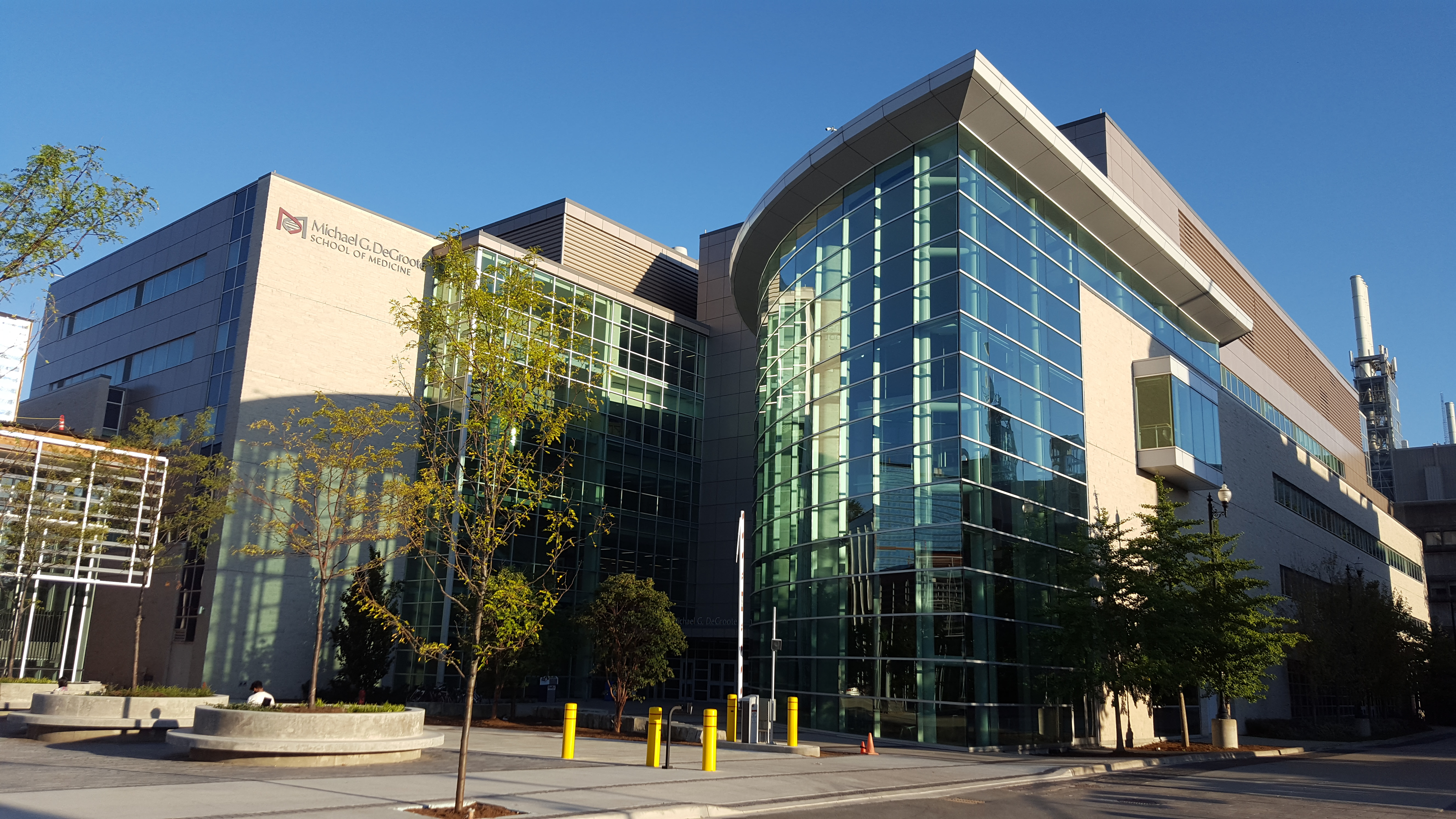
Michael DeGroote Centre for Learning and Discovery is a multipurpose building that houses several research facilities of the Faculty of Health Sciences.

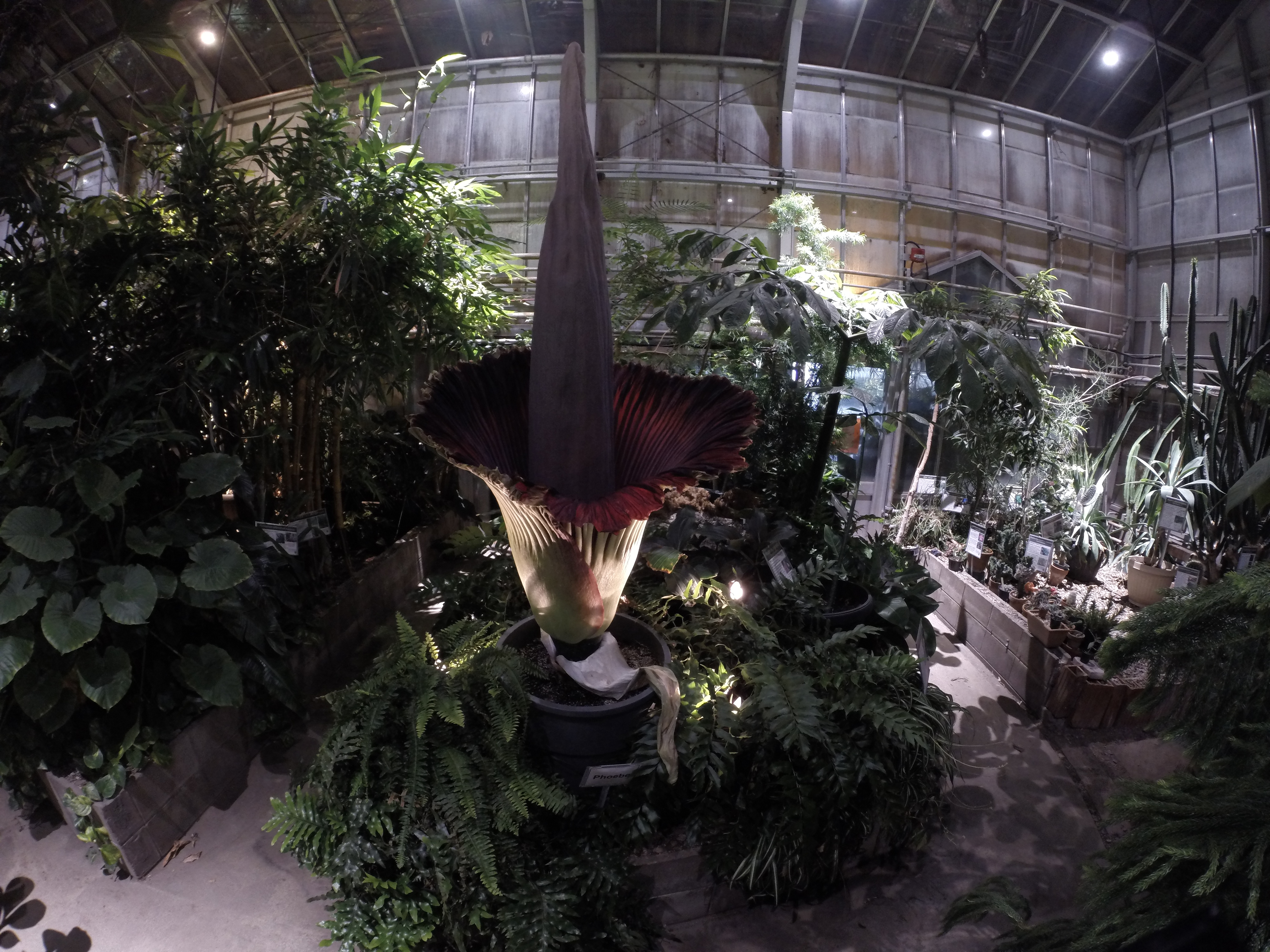
A titan arum blooming inside the McMaster Biology Greenhouse, one of many facilities used for research at the university

In 2018, Research Infosource named McMaster as the most research intensive university in the country with an average sponsored research income (external sources of funding) of C$434,700 per faculty member in 2017, the highest average in the country, and nearly double the average for universities in the "Medical-Doctoral" category. In the same year, graduate students averaged a sponsored research income of $82,800, the highest out of any full-service university. With a sponsored research income of $379.959 million in 2017, McMaster has the seventh largest sponsored research income amongst Canadian universities. In the 2015–2016 academic year, the federal government was the largest source of McMaster's sponsored research income (excluding affiliated hospitals), providing 61.4 per cent of McMaster's research budget, primarily through grants. Corporate research income account for 7.3 per cent of the overall research budget.

McMaster has been ranked on several bibliometric university rankings, which uses citation analysis to evaluate the impact a university has on academic publications. In 2019, the Performance Ranking of Scientific Papers for World Universities ranked McMaster 119th in the world, and sixth in Canada. The University Ranking by Academic Performance 2018–19 rankings placed the university 126th in the world, and sixth in Canada.

McMaster has received accolades for its research strengths, particularly in the field of health sciences. The Faculty of Health Science oversees $130 million a year in research, much of it conducted by scientists and physicians who teach in the medical school. The university also operates a brain bank, whose collection includes a portion of Albert Einstein's brain, preserved and held for medical research. Researchers there have identified differences in his brain that may relate to his genius for spatial and mathematical thinking. In addition to traditional forms of research, members of Faculty of Health Sciences have also been credited with developments within the medical practice. A McMaster research group led by David Sackett and later Gordon Guyatt had been credited for establishing the methodologies used in evidence-based medicine. Research institutes operated by the Faculty of Health Science include the Firestone Institute for Respiratory Health, and the Population Health Research Institute. The faculty also operates a Biosafety Level 3 laboratory.

Other research institutes operated by the university include the Origins Institute, the McMaster Manufacturing Research Institute, and the Brockhouse Institute for Materials Research (BIMR). BIMR was created in 1960 by Howard Petch, the institute was named after McMaster alumnus Bertram Brockhouse. The BIMR is an interdisciplinary research organization with the mandate to develop, support, and co-ordinate all materials research related activities at McMaster. Its membership of 123 faculty members is drawn from 13 departments in the Faculties of Science, Engineering, and Health Sciences, as well as several Canadian and international universities. Facilities of the BIMR include the Canadian Centre for Electron Microscopy, Centre for Crystal Growth, McMaster Analytical Xray Facility, Electronic and Magnetic Characterization Facility, and the Photonics Research Laboratories. The Canadian Centre for Electron Microscopy is home to the world's most powerful electron microscope; the Titan 80–300 cubed microscope has a magnification of 14 million and is used for material, medical, and nanotechnology research.

The Biology Greenhouse holds 217 plants in a 780-square-metre (8,400 sq ft) facility, and is used as a teaching and research facility by the Department of Biology. In addition to maintaining its permanent collection, the Biology Greenhouse also grows plants for both short-term research studies. In 2024, a new 1,060-square-metre (11,400 sq ft) greenhouse, housing over 200 plant species, was opened to replace the Biology Greenhouse.

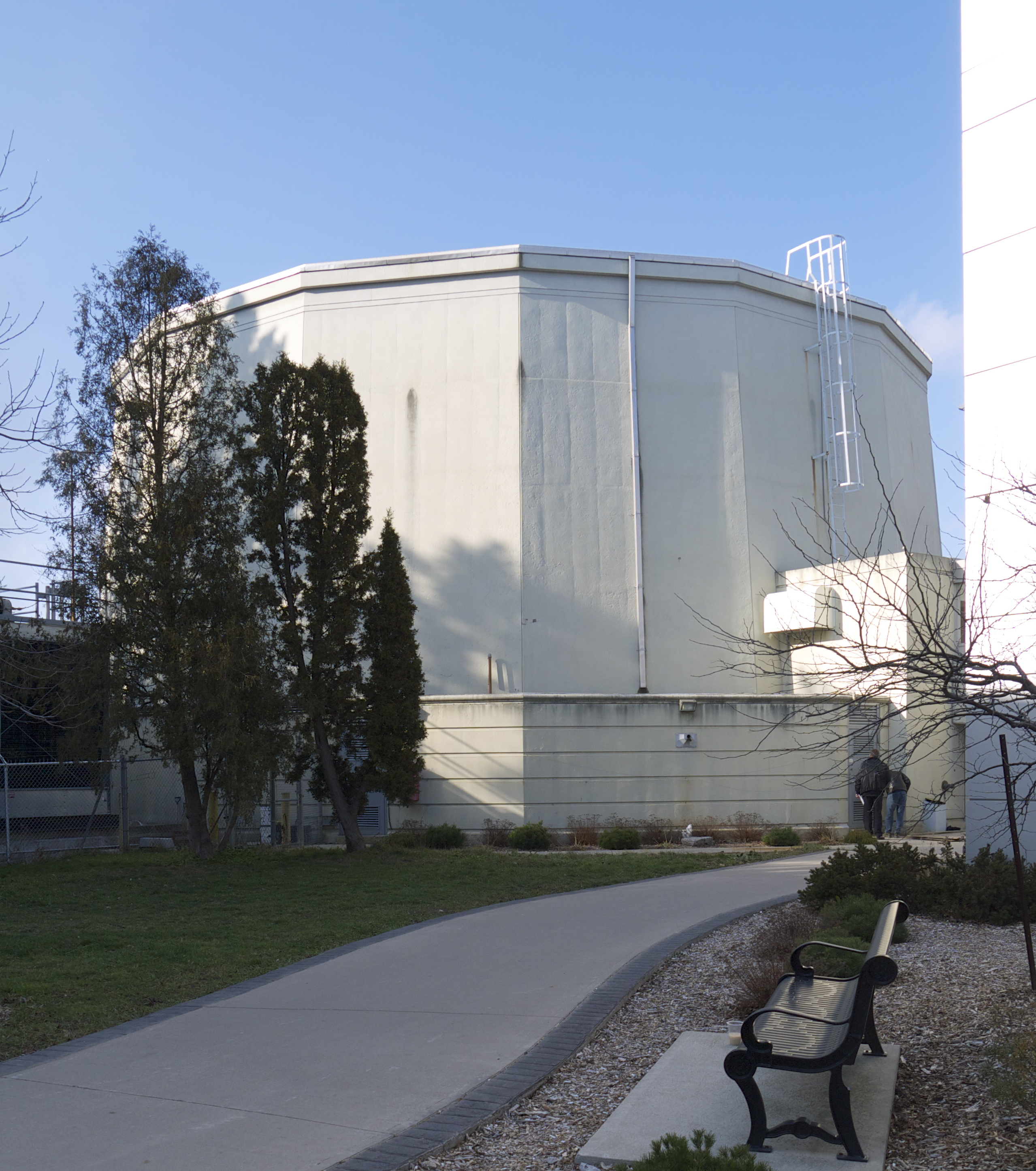
The McMaster Nuclear Reactor is the largest research reactor in the Commonwealth of Nations.

In addition, the university also operates the McMaster Nuclear Reactor, used for nuclear science and engineering research since 1959. The university regularly acquires an operating license for the reactor from the Canadian Nuclear Safety Commission, with the latest 20-year license issued on June 12, 2024, valid until June 30, 2044. The swimming pool reactor is used for research, educational, and commercial applications such as neutron radiography, and medical radioisotope production; including 60 per cent of the world's supply of iodine-125, an isotope used in nuclear medicine to treat prostate cancer. The production of molybdenum-99 has occasionally been moved to the university's reactor, when production at the National Research Universal reactor was temporarily halted.

The strength of nuclear science at McMaster was augmented in 1968 under the presidency of Dr. H.G. Thode by the construction of a 10MV Model FN Tandem particle accelerator. The 3MV Model KN single-ended accelerator was added the same year. The academic direction of the laboratory fell to the Physics Department in the early days, as it was primarily a nuclear structure laboratory. During the next 28 years, the nuclear research effort was extensive, with hundreds of graduate students trained and many publications generated.

=== Admissions ===
The requirements for admission differ between students from Ontario, other provinces in Canada, and international students due to the lack of uniformity in marking schemes. The acceptance rate at McMaster for full-time, first-year undergraduate applications in 2024 was approximately 59 per cent. The university received 47,544 applicants in 2023.

However, students entering McMaster's more selective undergraduate programs, including the Honours Health Sciences Program, Integrated Sciences, and Arts and Science programs, tend to have higher averages. In 2016, Yahoo! Finance named the university's Health Sciences program the toughest Canadian undergraduate program to gain admission to, with an acceptance rate of 4.5 per cent out of an average of 3,500 applicants each year.

The Michael DeGroote School of Medicine has notably developed admission tests adopted by other schools. In 2001, they developed the multiple-mini interview to address long-standing concerns over standard panel interviews; viewed as poor reflectors for medical school performance. This format uses short, independent assessments in a timed circuit to obtain aggregate scores in interpersonal skills, professionalism, ethical/moral judgment, and critical thinking to assess candidates. The multiple-mini interview has consistently shown to have a higher predictive validity for future performance than traditional interviews. The multiple-mini interview process has since been adopted by the majority of Canadian medical schools, as well as a number of medical schools in the United States. In 2010, the medical school developed the Computer-based Assessment for Sampling Personal Characteristics, to better assess the applicant's personal characteristics. Several other medical schools have adopted the CASPer test, including New York Medical College, Robert Wood Johnson Medical School, and the University of Ottawa Faculty of Medicine.

== Student life ==
Demographics of student body (2023–24)
	Undergraduate (Note: The following includes students enrolled in first professional degree programs.)	Graduate
Male	43%	43%
Female	55%	55%
Other	2%	2%
Domestic student	85%	69%
International student	15%	31%

In the 2023–2024 academic year, the university had an enrolment of 37,592 students: 32,105 undergraduate students and 5,487 graduate students. The student body is largely made up of Canadians, making up 85% of the undergraduate student population, and 69% of the graduate student population. Full-time students make up 96% of the undergraduate student body and 84% of the graduate student body. Among full-time students, the university has a first-time student retention rate of 92%.

=== Student groups ===
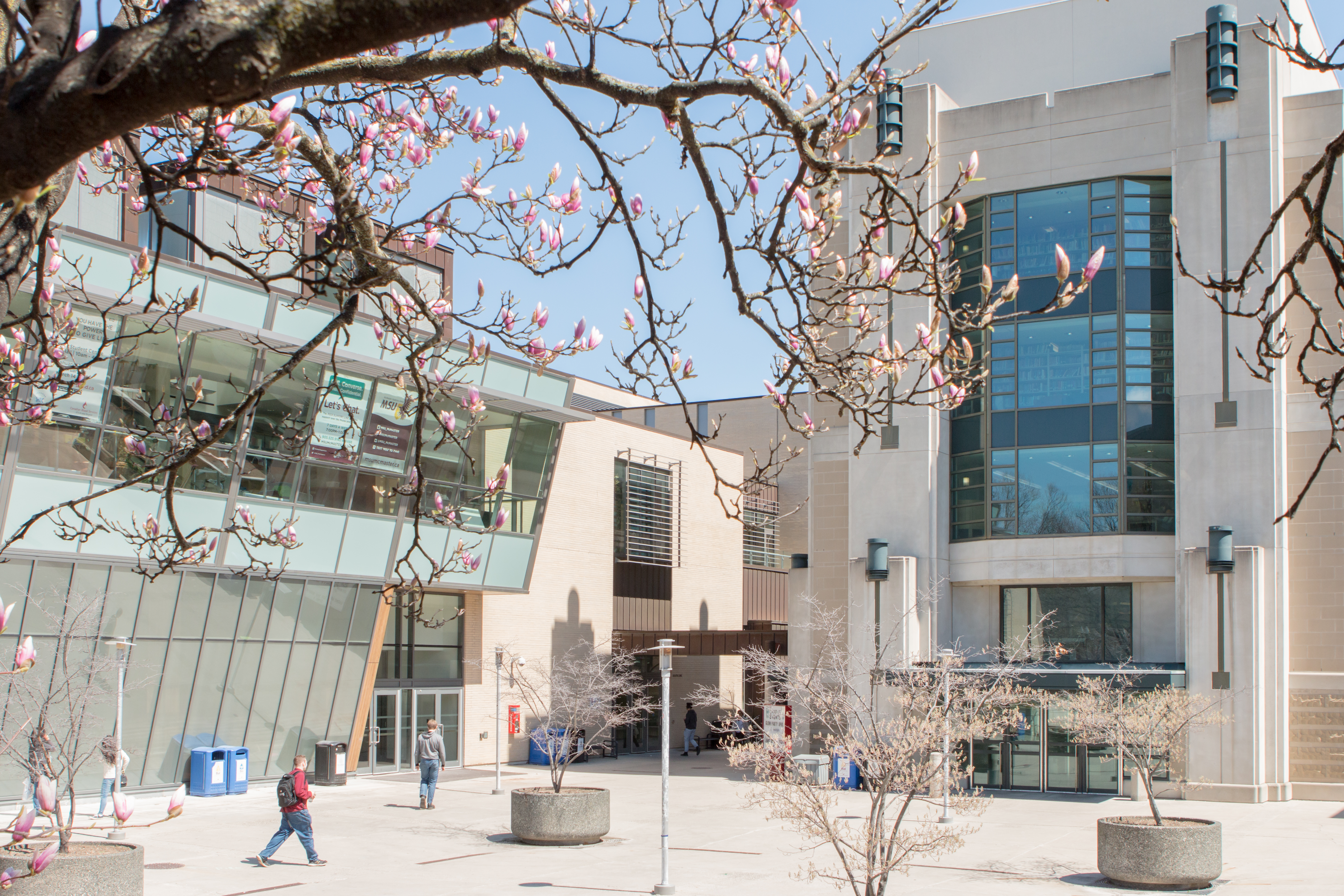
The student centre plaza, with the McMaster University Student Centre and Mills Memorial Library in the background, April 2017

The main student unions on administrative and policy issues are the McMaster Students Union for full-time undergraduates, the McMaster Association of Part-Time Students for part-time undergraduates, and the McMaster Graduate Students Association for postgraduates. In addition, each faculty has its own student representative body. There are more than 300 student organizations and clubs, covering a wide range of interests such as academics, culture, religion, social issues, and recreation. Many of them are centred at McMaster's student activity centre. The Silhouette, the student-run newspaper, is the oldest student service at McMaster University, in publication since 1929. Since 1968, the McMaster Engineering Society has published The Plumbline, the main satire magazine of McMaster University. The campus radio station CFMU-FM (93.3 FM) is Canada's second-oldest campus radio station, and has been broadcasting since 1978. MacInsiders, a once-popular online student-run forum and information network, had been operating from 2007 to 2019 and had over 18,000 registered members. The university is also home to the McMaster Improv Team, a drop-in club dedicated to practicing and performing improvisational comedy. The McMaster Artificial Intelligence Society, or Mac AI, was founded in December 2017 and grew to be the largest student-run AI club in the world – as of 2020, the club had over 1,000 general members, or around 2-3% of the McMaster student population.

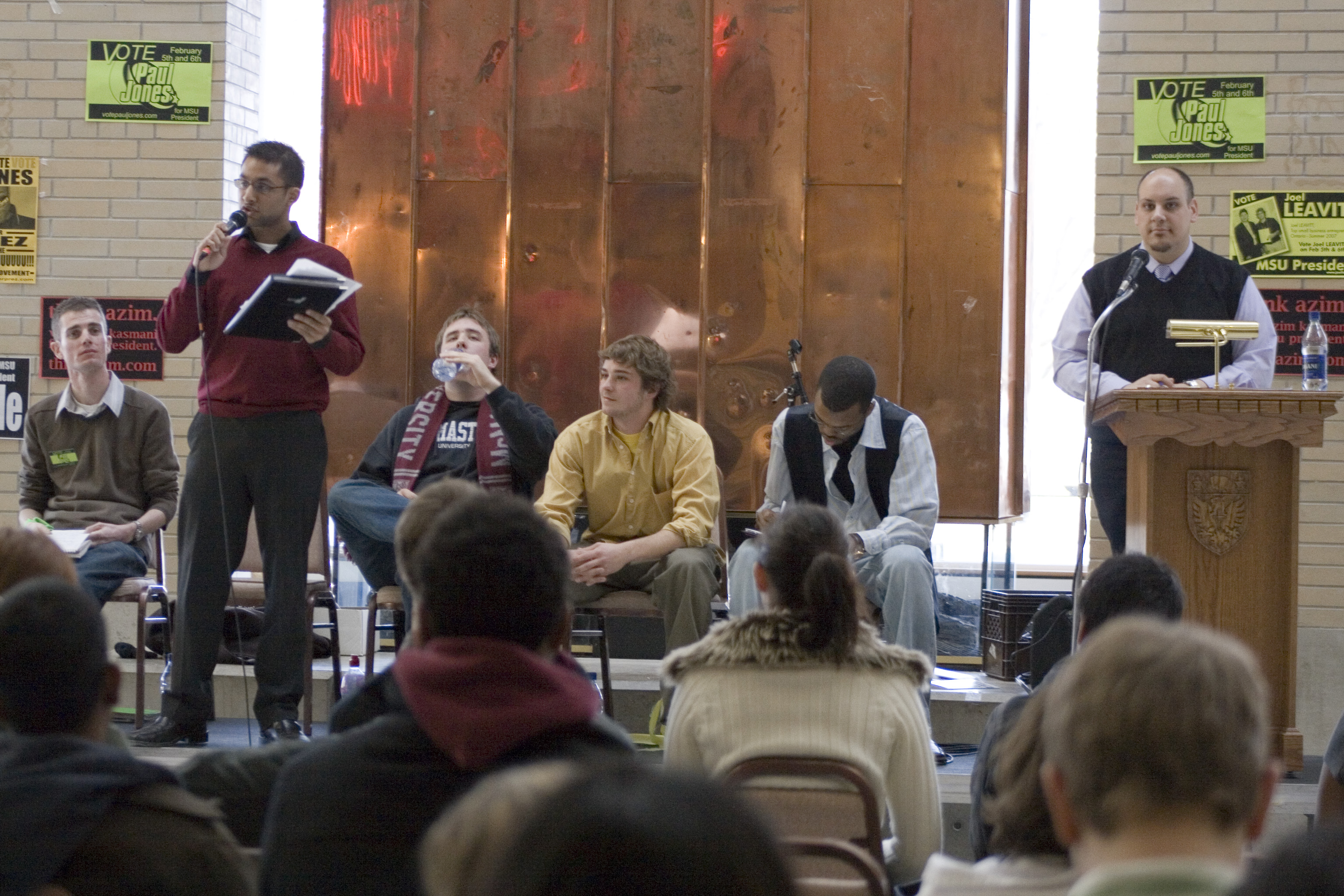
Forum for McMaster Students Union presidential candidates in 2008

The university hosts a number of honour societies, including the McMaster Honour Society and a chapter of the Golden Key International Honour Society. The university is home to two semi-professional acting companies, McMaster Musical Theatre and the McMaster Thespian Company. The McMaster Engineering Musical is an annual musical production written, directed, and cast by engineers. The production often features unique interpretations of popular songs or musicals. The university and the student unions do not recognize any fraternity or sororities; with existing fraternities and sororities chapters based at McMaster operating as non-accredited off-campus organizations.

=== Athletics ===
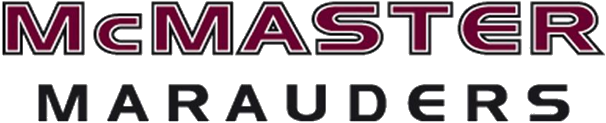
McMaster athletics wordmark

Athletics at McMaster is managed by the university's student affairs, under their athletics and recreation department. The university's varsity teams compete in the Ontario University Athletics conference of U Sports (formerly called Canadian Interuniversity Sport). The university's team sports programs include baseball, basketball, football, lacrosse, rugby, soccer, swimming, volleyball, ringette, and water polo. The first major sport game played at McMaster was in 1889, when a group of alumni from Toronto Baptist College and Woodstock College played an exhibition game against one another, sparking an early intercity rivalry between McMaster students. In 1897 the university placed all physical activity and sports under the jurisdiction of a central executive committee.

The varsity teams have been known as the McMaster Marauders since 1948, through a contest run by the student newspaper, The Silhouette, to name the university's men's basketball team. In 2016–2017 academic year, McMaster had over 1,100 student-athletes in either varsity or club teams. Ivor Wynne was the director of physical education from 1948 to 1965, and led efforts to establish the School of Physical Education and construct the university's athletic complex posthumously named for him. In 1952, he convinced the Canadian Intercollegiate Athletic Union (CIAU) to admit McMaster Marauders football into senior football competition along with McGill, Queen's, Toronto, and Western.

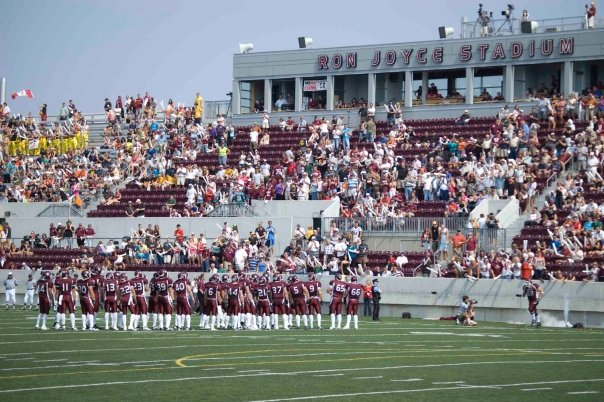
The McMaster Marauders football team at Ron Joyce Stadium

The Marauders have won 11 national championships and 139 provincial champions since 1961. The men's water polo team has won the Ontario University Athletics championship 25 times, making it the Marauders' most successful team at the provincial level. The men's wrestling team has been the Marauders' most successful team at the national level, winning the Canadian Interuniversity Sport championship four times. McMaster University has graduated 34 Olympic athletes, eight Olympic coaches, two Olympic administrators and two Olympic officials. As is mandatory for all members of U Sports, McMaster University does not provide full-ride athletic scholarships.

The university's sports facilities are in the northeast corner of the main campus. The university has a number of sports facilities, including the David Braley Athletic Centre and the Ron Joyce Stadium. Ron Joyce Stadium includes a full-sized Canadian football field and FIFA-sized soccer pitch. The stadium features permanent seating for 6,000 and temporary seating for an additional 6,000 on the other side of the field when needed. Ron Joyce Stadium is not only used by the university's football and soccer varsity teams it is also used as the training camp for the Hamilton Tiger-Cats of the Canadian Football League and as the home stadium for the Hamilton Nationals of Major League Lacrosse.

Intramural sport leagues and tournaments have a high level of participation at McMaster. Opportunities are offered at multiple skill levels and across a variety of sports to service a range of interest and ability. Sports offered include traditional sports like volleyball, basketball, soccer and cricket, as well as less traditional events like dodgeball, inner tube water polo, and extreme potato sack racing.

== Insignias and other representations ==
McMaster uses a number of symbols to represent the institution, with the university's Office of Public Relations managing the university's visual identity. The university's present visual identity and logo was approved by the university senate in 1997. Other symbols utilized by the university includes a flag, unveiled on 29 September 2015, as well as a ceremonial mace. The university mace was bequeathed in 1950 from the graduating class of 1900. Used in ceremonies such as convocation, the mace symbolizes the authority of the university senate to confer degrees. The university also uses several tag lines as a part of its overall branding effort. As of 2007, the branding tag line used by the university is "Learning Without Borders," although the previous tag line, "Inspire, Innovation, and Discovery," is still used to a limited extent.

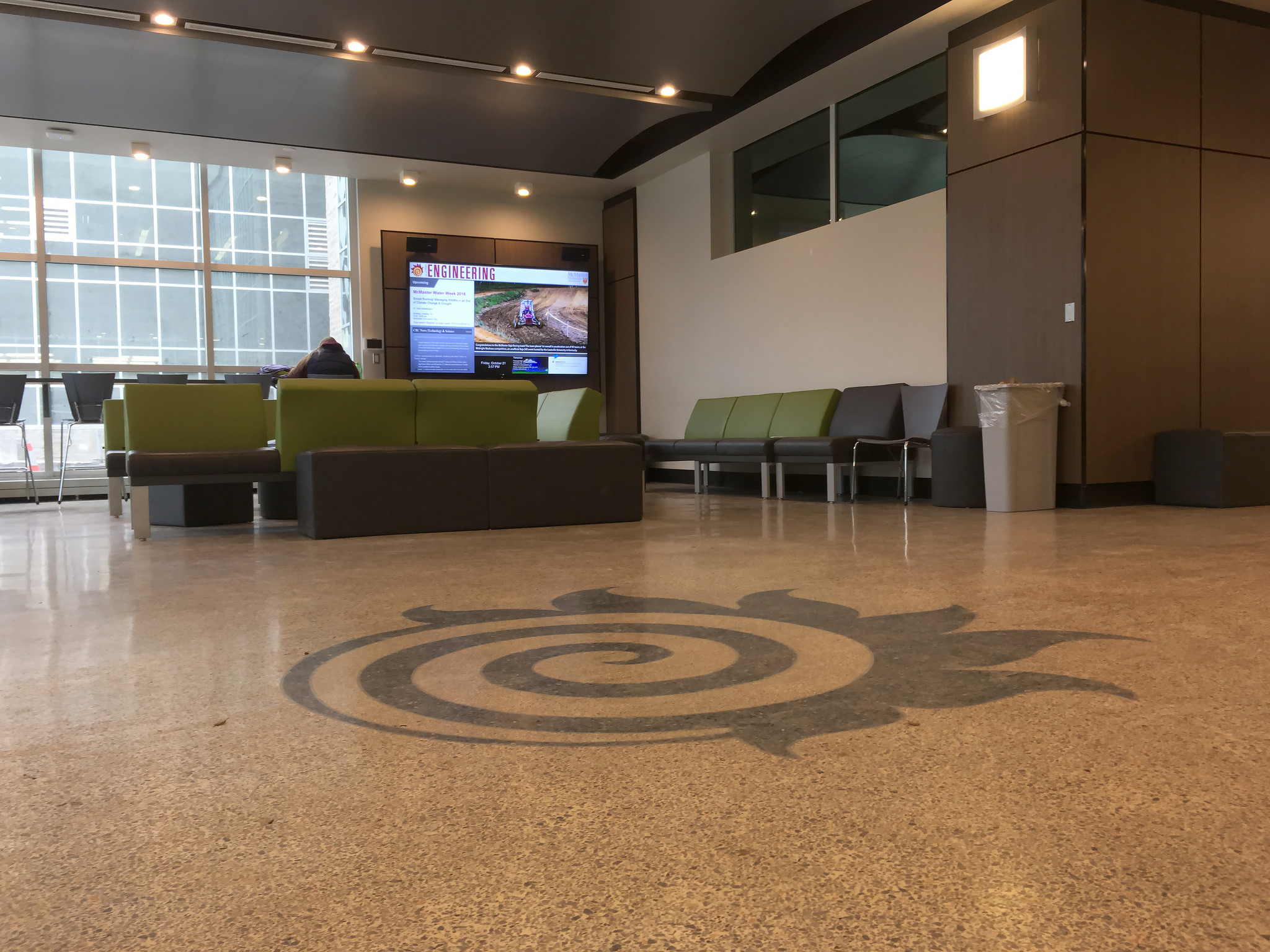
The Faculty of Engineering's fireball symbol on the floor at John Hodgins Engineering Building

In addition to the visual representations of the institution, the university's individual departments, faculties, and schools also employ symbols to visually represent them. One such example is the Faculty of Engineering's fireball emblem, adopted by the faculty in 1960. The fireball was adopted from the coat of arms of the defunct Hamilton College.

=== Motto and songs ===
The university's motto, chosen from Colossians 1:17, is ΤΑ ΠΑΝΤΑ ΕΝ ΧΡΙΣΤΩΙ ΣΥΝΕΣΤΗΚΕΝ. The motto, adopted in 1888, is Greek for "In Christ all things consist". The McMaster motto is unusual in that it employs Greek instead of Latin or English. The use of Latin reflects the origin of universities in mediaeval institutions in which Latin was more prominent than Greek. McMaster's founders desired to go back beyond the Middle Ages to the earliest days of the Christian faith, and therefore used the Greek form.

Notable among a number of songs commonly played and sung at various events such as commencement and convocation, and athletic games are "The Alma Mater Song" (1935), with words by Mrs. A.A. Burridge and music by Hugh Brearly; "Shout for McMaster! (The McMaster March)", with words by Claire Senior Burke et al., and music by Arthur Burridge; and "My Mac" (1982), with words and music by Fred Moyes. Specifically, "Shout for McMaster!" is recognized as the university's fight song.

=== Coat of arms ===
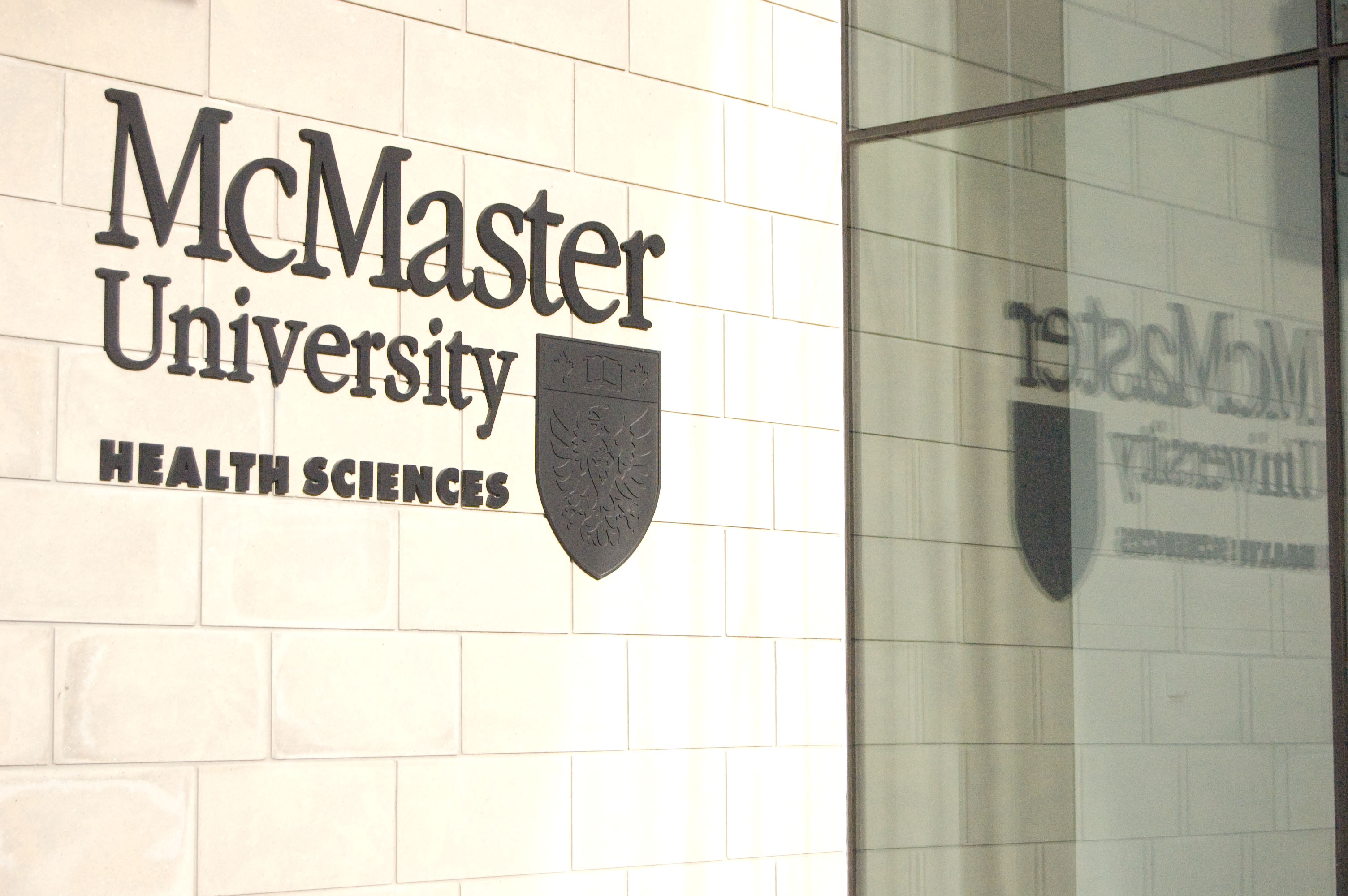
Signage at the Michael DeGroote Centre for Learning and Discovery featuring the university's arms

After the university moved to Hamilton in 1930, the university petitioned Lord Lyon King of Arms in Edinburgh for a coat of arms. The request was granted on behalf of The Crown on 20 October 1930. In 1997, the board of governors introduced a simplified shield design, which recognized the tradition of McMaster's heraldry while improving the quality of print and electronic reproduction. The university's arms and badge was registered with the Canadian Heraldic Authority on 15 October 2006.

The coat of arms consists of a shield, a crest, and a motto, together with a helmet. The shield contains an eagle, symbolic of the heavenly vision, with a cross on its breast to indicate Christianity as the inspiration for the university's vision. The chief of the shield bears an open book, a common symbol of learning. A golden maple leaf is situated on each side of the book, signifying the university's charter was granted by the Province of Ontario. The helmet, above the shield, has the open visor and forward-facing style typically used by universities. The mantling surrounding the shield and helmet represents the cloak worn over a knight's armour as protection from the sun. The crest, above the helmet, is a stag and oak tree, which serves as a tribute to the Canadian senator, William McMaster, who also used a stag and oak on his insignias. The motto is above the crest, as is common in Scottish heraldry.

Coat of arms of McMaster University
Notes Granted 15 October 2006 Crest On a mount Vert before an oak tree a stag courant Proper. Escutcheon Argent an eagle displayed Gules beaked membered and charged on the breast with a Latin cross flory Or on a chief Azure an open book Proper bound Gules clasped Or between two maple leaves Or. Motto ΤΑ ΠΑΝΤΑ ΕΝ ΧΡΙΣΤΩΙ ΣΥΝΕΣΤΗΚΕΝ (In Christ All Things Consist)

== Notable alumni and faculty ==
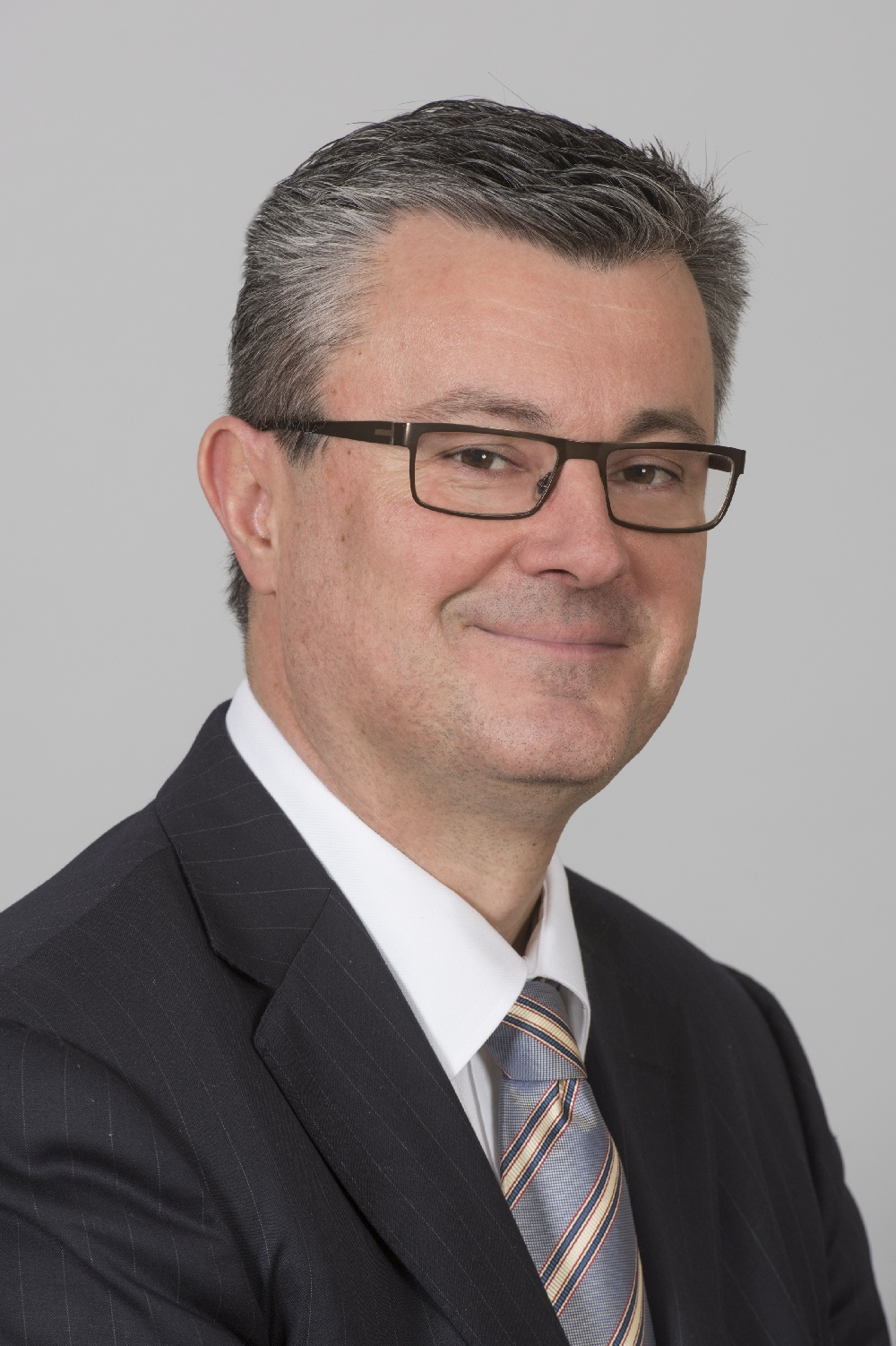
Tihomir Orešković, 11th prime minister of Croatia

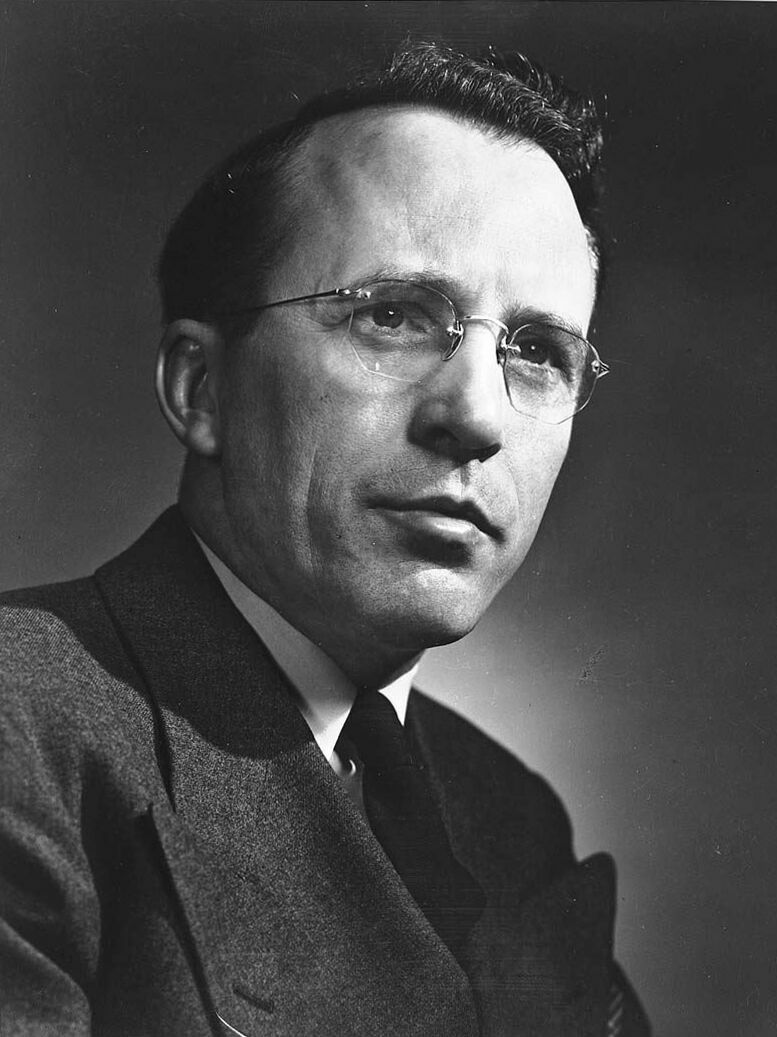
Tommy Douglas, 7th premier of Saskatchewan and first leader of the NDP

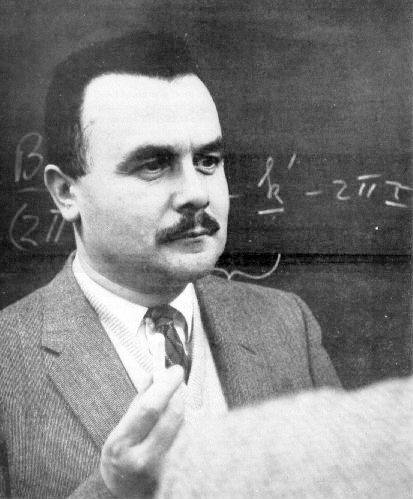
Bertram Brockhouse, Nobel laureate in physics, for his work with neutron scattering

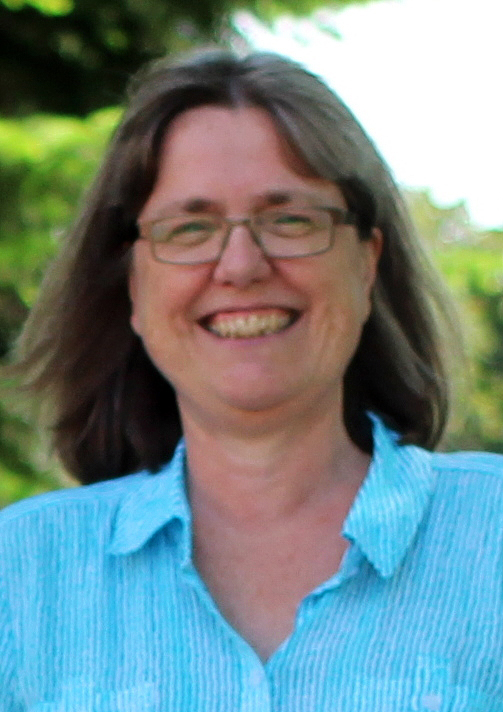
Donna Strickland, Nobel laureate in physics for her work with laser physics

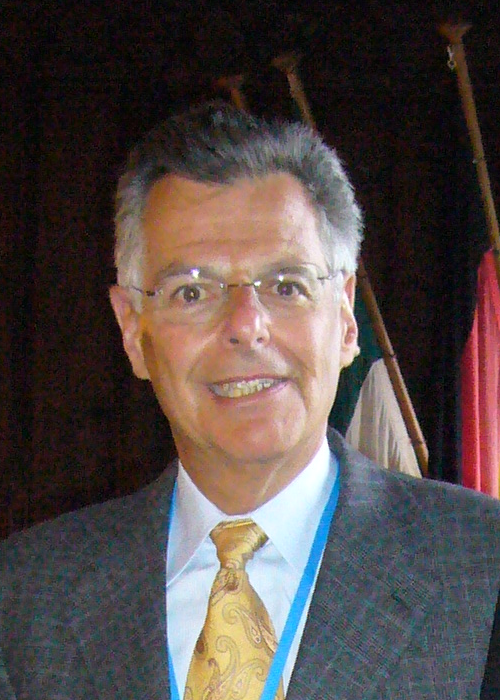
Myron Scholes, Nobel laureate in economics for his work with the Black–Scholes model

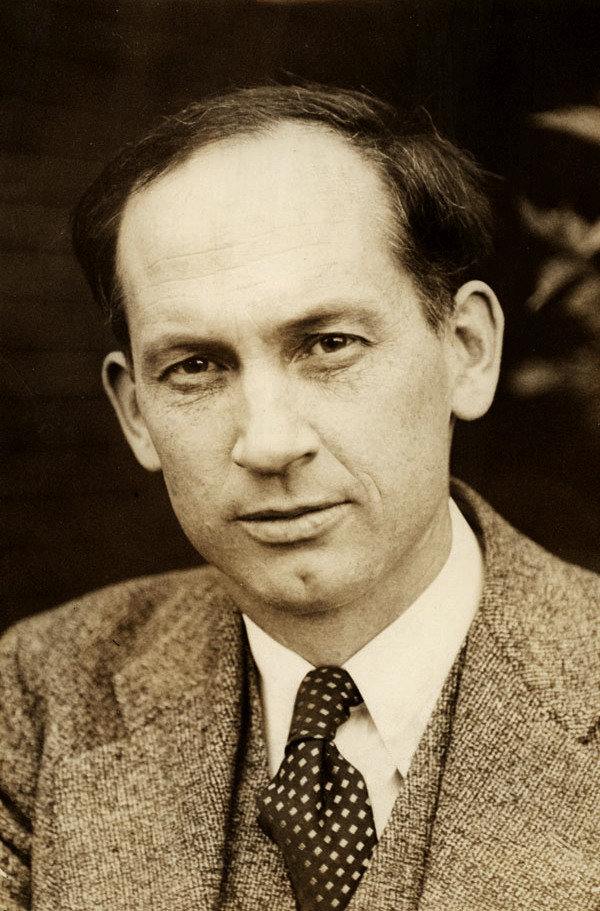
Harold Innis, contributed to the staples thesis and Toronto School of communication theory

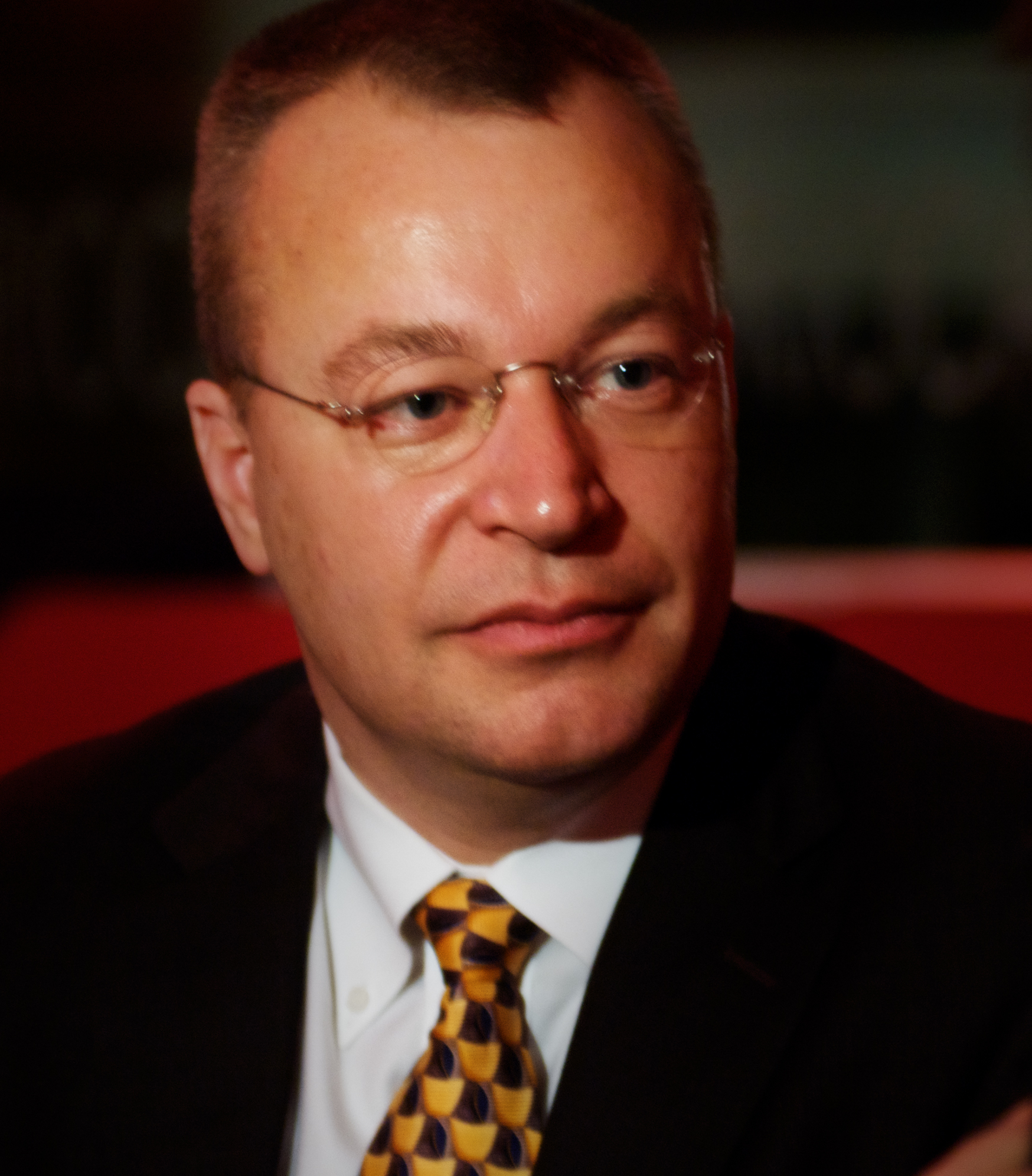
Stephen Elop, president and chief executive officer of the Nokia Corporation

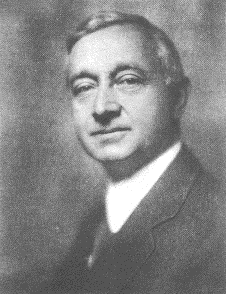
Cyrus S. Eaton, founder of Republic Steel and chairman of C&O Railway

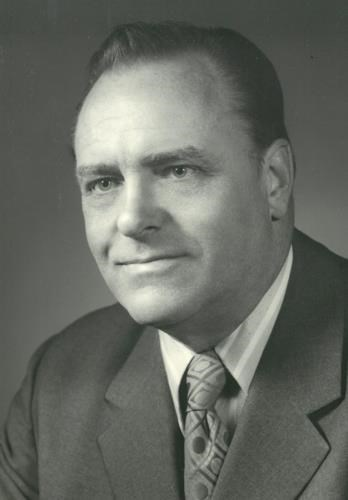
Robert N. Washburn, former vice president of Bell Canada; served in the Royal Canadian Navy during World War II as a lieutenant

As of 2024, McMaster University has over 253,000 alumni residing in 145 countries. Throughout McMaster's history, faculty, alumni, and former students have played prominent roles in many fields, accumulating a number of awards including Nobel prizes, Rhodes scholarships, the Gates Cambridge Scholarship, and the Lasker Award. Nobel Prize winners include alumnus Myron Scholes, awarded the Nobel Memorial Prize in Economic Sciences in 1997 for his work with the Black–Scholes model. Two individuals from McMaster were also award the Nobel Prize in Physics, faculty member Bertram Brockhouse in 1994 for his work in neutron scattering; and alumna Donna Strickland in 2018 for her work on laser physics. Alumnus James Orbinski accepted the Nobel Peace Prize in 1999 on behalf of Doctors Without Borders as the organization's president.

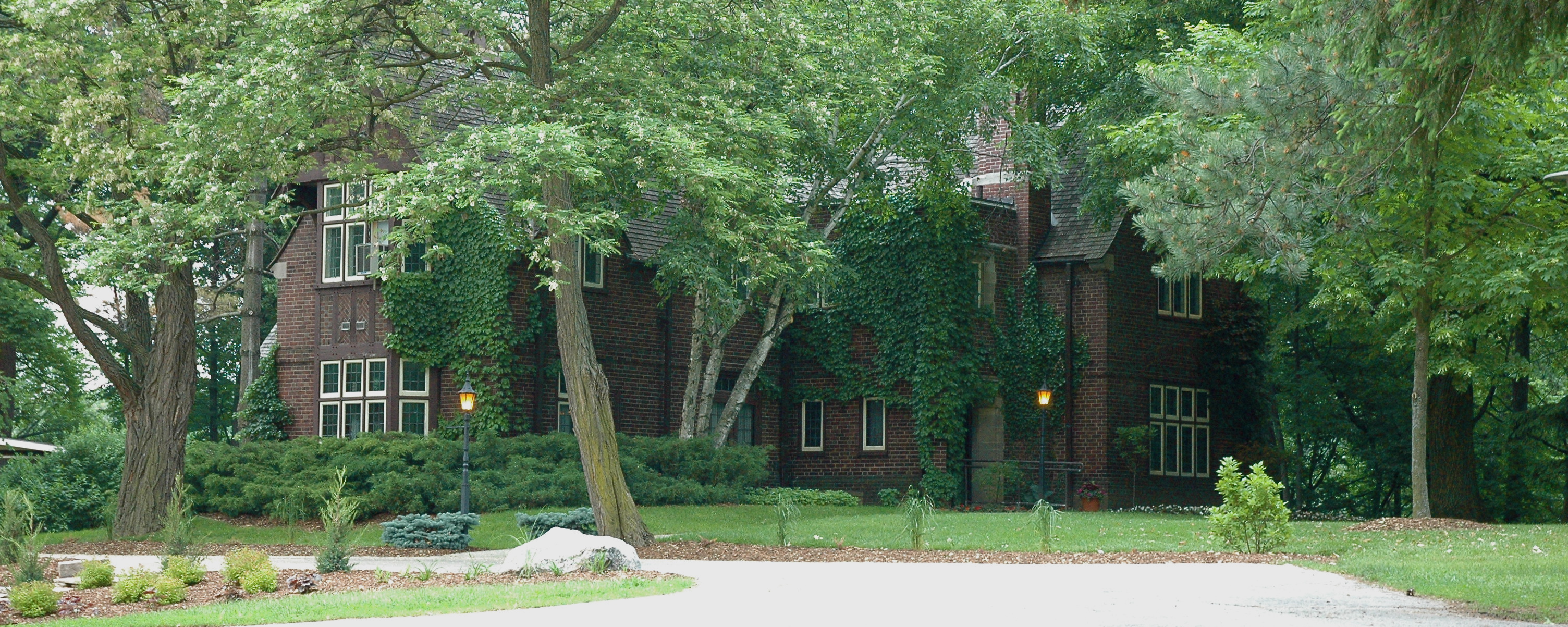
The university's Office of Alumni Advancement and the McMaster Alumni Association are housed at Alumni House.

Prominent alumni in the field of science include Douglas L. Coleman, who discovered leptin; Richard Bader, noted for his work on the atoms in molecules theory; Harold E. Johns, who pioneered the use of cobalt-60 in the treatment of cancer; Karl Clark, who pioneered the separation method to extract bitumen from the oil sands; and Peter R. Jennings, computer programmer and developer of Microchess. Notable faculty members include chemist Ronald Gillespie, who helped shape VSEPR theory, as well as David Sackett and Gordon Guyatt, whose research team was credited for establishing the methodologies used in evidence-based medicine. Notable alumni and faculty members in the field of social sciences include Harold Innis, who helped shape communication theory and the staples thesis, and sociologist Henry Giroux, one of the founding theorists of critical pedagogy. Two medical researchers, and members of McMaster had travelled in space; faculty member Dafydd Williams, and alumna Roberta Bondar, the first Canadian woman in space.

Many former students have gained prominence for serving in government. Croatian Prime Minister, Tihomir Orešković was an alumnus of the university. Lincoln Alexander, the former Lieutenant Governor of Ontario, as well as the first visible-minority Lieutenant Governor in Canada was another alumnus of the university. Canadian premiers that have graduated from the university include the former premier of Ontario, Dalton McGuinty, and the former premier of Saskatchewan, Tommy Douglas. Many graduates have also served in the House of Commons of Canada, including, Tony Valeri, the Government House Leader; and Lawrence Pennell, the Solicitor General of Canada. Roy Kellock, a Justice of the Supreme Court of Canada was a graduate from the university. Charles Aubrey Eaton, a member of the United States House of Representatives, and signor of the United Nations Charter on behalf of the United States, was an alumnus of the university.

A number of prominent business leaders have also studied at McMaster. Examples include David Braley, owner of the Toronto Argonauts and BC Lions of the Canadian Football League; Stephen Elop, former president and CEO of Nokia; Cyrus S. Eaton, founder of Republic Steel and chairman of Chesapeake and Ohio Railway; Paul D. House, current executive chairman of Tim Hortons; Lynton Wilson, chairman of Bell Canada, CAE Inc., and Nortel; Michael Lee-Chin, current chairman, CEO of AIC Limited; Kathy Bardswick, president and CEO of The Co-operators, Joy Ford Austin, former executive director of Humanities DC, and Rob Burgess, former chairman and CEO of Macromedia.

A number of McMaster alumni have also had successful sports careers, including Syl Apps of the Toronto Maple Leafs; and NHL coach Roger Neilson. The university has had 34 of its graduates compete in the Olympic games, including Olympic medalists Larry Cain, Adam van Koeverden, and Mark Heese. McMaster faculty member Norman Lane was also an Olympic medalist. Several alumni of the university have also become prominent in the entertainment industry, including comedians, actors and directors. Such alumni include Eugene Levy, Martin Short, Jonathan Frid, Ivan Reitman, Dave Thomas, and Max Kerman of Canadian rock band Arkells.

== See also ==
- Iron Ring Clock
- Text Analysis Portal for Research
- Whidden Lectures
