= McMaster Faculty of Science =

Faculty of McMaster University in Hamilton, Ontario

Coordinates: 43.26187°N 79.92027°W

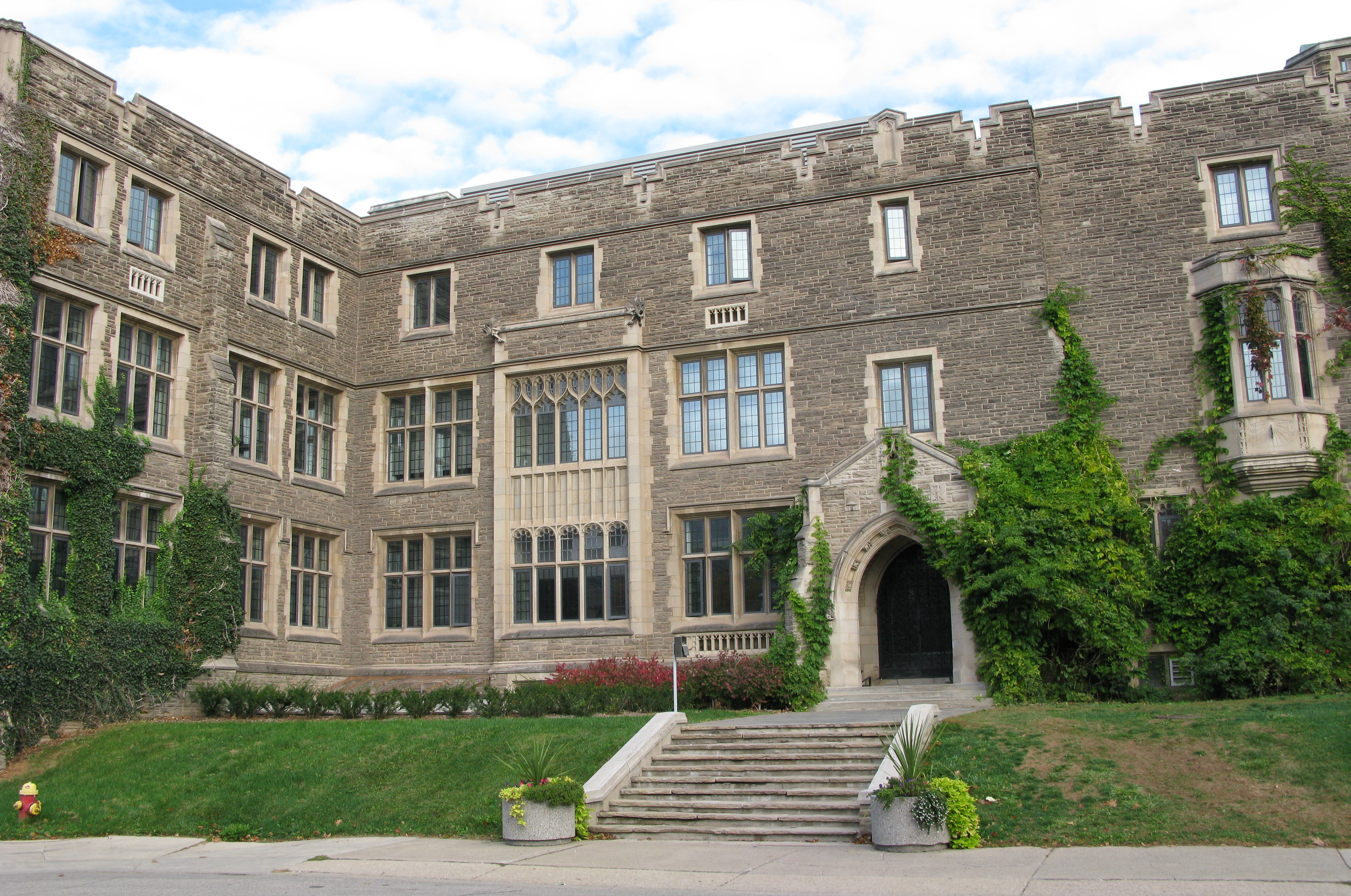
- Hamilton Hall is the home to classes and offices in the Faculty of Science
- Type: Public
- Established: 1962; 64 years ago
- Parent institution: McMaster University
- Dean: Maureen MacDonald
- Students: 7,400
- Location: Hamilton, Ontario, Canada
- Website: science.mcmaster.ca

The McMaster Faculty of Science is the largest of six faculties at McMaster University in Hamilton, Ontario, Canada. Founded in 1962, the faculty is located in the Westdale neighbourhood. It houses 6,800 undergraduate students and 600 graduate students, across 39 upper-year undergraduate programs ranging from astrophysics, biochemistry, earth and environmental sciences, to life sciences, human behaviour, kinesiology and medical and radiation sciences. Notable discoveries at McMaster University include the development of neutron spectroscopy by Bertram Brockhouse which earned him a Nobel Prize in Physics in 1994.

Under the presidency of Dr. H.G. Thode in the 1960s, scientific research at McMaster was intensive and yielded important discoveries in the areas of science and engineering. In 1959, McMaster's Nuclear Reactor was built for the purpose of nuclear and medical radiation research. McMaster is the only Canadian university that contains a nuclear reactor in their campus. Scientific research at McMaster University earned the university high rankings in the areas of research and strength in science, where it is ranked seventh in Canada and 212th in the world according to QS University Rankings 2017 for Natural Sciences.

== Departments, Schools and Programs of the Faculty of Science ==
There are 6 departments and 2 interdisciplinary schools in the Faculty of Science:

- Department of Biology
- Department of Chemistry & Chemical Biology
- School of Earth, Environment & Society
- School of Interdisciplinary Science
- Department of Kinesiology
- Department of Mathematics & Statistics
- Department of Physics & Astronomy
- Department of Psychology, Neuroscience & Behaviour

=== Academic programs ===
A co-op (or cooperative education) option is offered in 14 undergraduate science programs: Actuarial & Financial Mathematics, Biochemistry, Biology & Pharmacology, BioPhysics, Chemical Biology, Chemistry, Earth & Environmental Sciences, Environmental Sciences, Life Sciences, Mathematics & Statistics, Medical & Health Physics, Molecular Biology & Genetics and Physics. The term "cooperative education" emphasizes the partnership between the employer, the student and university. Students taking the science co-op option have 4 work terms employed in their field in addition to the regular academic requirements. The co-op program is typically completed in 5 years.

The Medical Radiation Sciences program is offered in collaboration with Mohawk College as part of the School of Interdisciplinary Sciences. It prepares students to practice as either a radiographer, sonographer, or radiation therapist, and includes three mandatory, semester-long clinical placements. Students graduate with both an Honours Bachelor of Medical Radiation Sciences and an Ontario College Advanced Diploma.

The Faculty of Science offers Masters and PhD degrees in 16 graduate programs.

== Deans of Science ==
Dean	Years served
Gillian Goward	2026-
Bruce Newbold (Acting)	2025-2026
Maureen MacDonald	2017-2025
Bruce Milliken (Acting)	2016-2017
Robert L. Baker	2013-2016
Peter G. Sutherland (Acting)	2012-2013
John P. Capone	2005-2012
Peter G. Sutherland	1996-2005
Harvey P. Weingarten	1995-1996
Robert H. McNutt	1989-1995
Ronald F. Childs	1984-1989
Donald W. Sprung	1975-1984
Dennis R. McCalla	1967-1972
Ronald P. Graham	1962-1967

== Scientific Research ==
There are currently 6 Funded and Endowed Research Chairs, 19 Canada Research Chairs, and 3 Faculty of Science Research Chairs in the Faculty of Science.

== Centres, Institutes and Facilities ==
The Faculty of Science hosts or supports several research-based centres and institutes that feature integrated, multi-disciplinary work.

- Biointerfaces Institute uses high-throughput methods to better understand the interface between biological and synthetic materials. By studying how biological systems respond to synthetic materials, and vice versa, the Institute seeks to expand our ability to create better biosensors and medical implants, among other applications.
- Brockhouse Institute for Material Research is named after Nobel Prize winner Bertram Brockhouse and is dedicated to materials research, development and analysis. Facilities include the Canadian Centre for Electron Microscopy (CCEM), Centre for Crystal Growth, McMaster Analytical X-ray Diffraction Facility, and the Photonics Research Laboratories.
- McMaster Centre for Climate Change is a multidisciplinary research centre with the established goal of bringing together researchers to study and model climate processes, the effects of climate change, and their possible mitigation.
- McMaster Institute for Music and Mind, where scientists, researchers, and musicians study questions about the physical structure, evolution, neural processing, performance, and perception of music, dance and media arts.
- McMaster Institute for Transportation and Logistics (MITL) was created to work with business and government partners to improve the efficiency of transportation systems and the competitiveness of the logistics/manufacturing sector.
- Nuclear Research Building, McMaster Nuclear Reactor
- Thode Library of Science and Engineering
- Origins Institute conducts transdisciplinary research to study fundamental questions in science. Areas of exploration include the origin of life and astrobiology, astrophysics, the origins of dark matter and dark energy in the universe, and the beginnings of life.
- Physical Activity Centre of Excellence (PACE) is an exercise research and training centre. Researchers study ways to improve health and well-being among older adults and people with chronic disease or disability.
