= McMaster Nuclear Reactor =

Nuclear reactor in Hamilton, Ontario, Canada

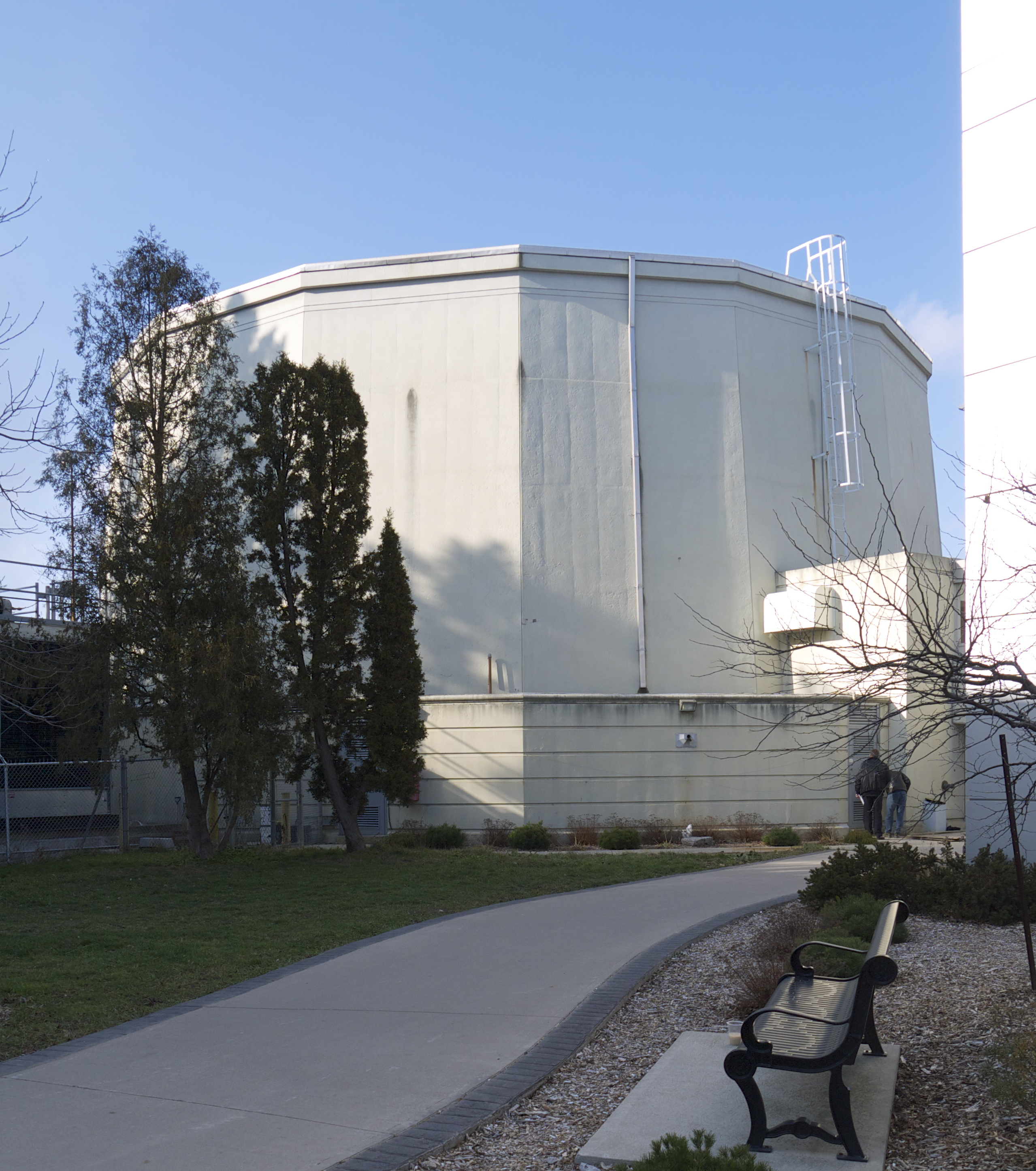
- Reactor building in 2013
- Country: Canada
- Location: Hamilton, Ontario
- Coordinates: 43°15′40.4″N 79°55′17.2″W
- Status: Operational
- Construction began: 1957
- Commission date: 1959
- Owner: McMaster University
- Operator: McMaster University

Nuclear power station
- Reactor type: open pool reactor

Power generation
- Units operational: 5 MW

External links
- Website: nuclear.mcmaster.ca

The McMaster Nuclear Reactor (MNR) is a 5 MW_{th} open pool reactor located on the campus of McMaster University, in Hamilton, Ontario, Canada.

== Description ==
MNR began operating in April 1959, as the first university-based research reactor in the Commonwealth of Nations, and has been the highest-flux research reactor in Canada since the closing of the National Research Universal (NRU) reactor at Chalk River Laboratories in 2018. The reactor consists of two connected pools; the core can be located and operated in either one. This allows the core to be moved away from experimental apparatus for maintenance. MNR is an example of a reactor where the core is visible while the reactor is operating. The core itself appears to be glowing blue when looked at from the surface, as a result of the Cherenkov radiation.

MNR is the only research reactor in Canada with a full containment structure. The reactor is fuelled with low-enrichment uranium and cooled and moderated with light water. Heat is transported to the atmosphere through the secondary coolant system via two cooling towers adjacent to the reactor building.

The reactor is used for a variety of purposes: undergraduate education involves NAA (Neutron Activation Analysis), reactor physics experiments and radioisotopes for tracers and counting experiments. Graduate studies use neutron beams for neutron radiography, neutron diffraction, prompt gamma NAA and geochronological techniques. Commercial activities include radioisotope production and neutron radiography. The facilities also include a hot cell and high-activity cobalt source and high level radioisotope laboratories. Researchers using MNR are based at McMaster as well as other universities in Canada and around the world.

The MNR also produces half of the world's supply of iodine-125, a radioisotope that is used to treat various types of cancer. During the 2009 shutdown of the Chalk River reactor, however, the university increased production of iodine-125 by 20% and offered to retrofit the MNR to handle the production of molybdenum-99. The MNR had previously handled the production of molybdenum in the 1970s when the Chalk River facilities underwent a vessel replacement.

== Alleged links to terrorism and lawsuit ==
Paul L. Williams, an American author, has published books which claim that McMaster University in general and the nuclear reactor specifically have been infiltrated by terrorist groups, who have managed to steal 82 kilograms (181 lb) of unspecified nuclear material.

The University strenuously denies these claims, and in 2007 was in the process of suing Williams for upwards of $2 million. The Canadian Nuclear Safety Commission, which regulates all radioactive material in Canada, have released a letter stating that "We can confirm that there has never been a report of any nuclear material that has been lost or stolen from McMaster's reactor".

== See also ==
- Nuclear reactor
- Research reactor
