= McMaster Faculty of Social Sciences =

Faculty of McMaster University in Hamilton, Ontario

Coordinates: 43.26394°N 79.91691°W

- Type: Public
- Established: 1968; 58 years ago
- Parent institution: McMaster University
- Dean: Jeremiah Hurley
- Location: Hamilton, Ontario, Canada
- Website: socialsciences.mcmaster.ca

The McMaster Faculty of Social Sciences is a division of McMaster University. It offers a wide range of undergraduate programs through the Faculty's academic units, as well as Master's and Doctoral programs.

== Departments of the Faculty of Social Sciences ==
The Faculty of Social Sciences at McMaster University has a variety of different departments offering various courses. There are 12 different departments that make up the Faculty of Social Sciences including the following;

- Anthropology
- Economics
- Environment & Society
- Health, Aging and Society (combines Gerontology and Health Studies)
- Indigenous Studies
- Labour Studies
- Political Science
- Psychology, Neuroscience and Behaviour
- Religious Studies
- Social Psychology
- Social Work
- Sociology
- The Institute for Globalization and the Human Condition

=== Gilbrea Centre for Studies in Aging ===
The Gilbrea Centre for Studies in Aging is an interdisciplinary research centre focused on the study of aging, with expertise in the social, cultural and politics of aging. The Centre aims to improve the lives of older adults by linking research with local, national and international policy and practice initiatives. The Centre is housed in the Faculty of Social Sciences and maintains a close relationship with the Department of Health, Aging and Society. Over 55 associated faculty members from across the University contribute to research within the Centre

The Gilbrea Centre for Studies in Aging was founded as a research centre in 2011. The Centre was named after the donor's ancestral estate in Northern England. The Centre consists of four membership groups: Associate Members (Faculty), Student Members, Partner Organizations, and Seniors. The governance structure for the Gilbrea Centre includes an Executive Committee and an Advisory Board composed of representatives from academic research (Faculty and student), partner organizations, older people and business/industry. In 2015, the Gilbrea Centre established a Senior-Scholar-in-Residence position– a senior academic who conducts research on aging with faculty, staff, and partner organizations. Research conducted at the Gilbrea Centre for Studies on Aging addresses five themes: Aging and Place, Policy and the Life Course, Indigenous Aging, Diversity and Inequality, Technology and Aging

== Rankings ==
According to the 2016 National Taiwan University: Performance Ranking of Scientific Papers for World Universities McMaster University is 68th in the world and fourth in Canada in the "Social Sciences" category. In 2016 Shanghai Jiao Tong University ranked the faculty as 101-151 in the world in 2016, and 4th in Canada.

== Noted alumni ==
- Myron Scholes
- Alex Anthopoulous
- Martin Short

== McMaster Social Sciences Society ==
Established in 1988, the McMaster Social Sciences Society, commonly called MSSS ("The M-Triple-S"), is composed of undergraduate Social Sciences students enrolled in 3 or more courses per term in an academic session. The Society represents its members on committees, is a point of contact with the campus-wide McMaster Students Union, organizes social and academic events, and provides funding support to student clubs relating to academic departments in the Faculty of Social Sciences. Events organized by the Society include an annual formal, and participation in both McMaster's frosh week (titled "Welcome Week"). While all executives have a say in the workings and events of the MSSS, there is an executive member elected to specialize in one field of the Society's operations. Elections for these positions occur yearly and are open only to students in the Faculty of Social Sciences. The Society's office is located in L.R. Wilson Hall.

== The Blu Cru ==
The group known as the Blue Cru is street team of the MSSS led by the current "Spirit Leader" executive(s). Their name originates from the characteristic bright blue jumpsuits they wear on the job. As a university adaptation of a street team, they double as peer mentors and orientation volunteers. Any Social Science student is welcomed to join and, mostly due to this, there has never been a full list of members. Meaning most members of the Crew remain anonymous to the general public, credited for their work only as a collective.

== The Frontline ==
The MSSS also publishes a quarterly newspaper titled The Frontline. The newspaper dates back to approximately 1986, when the MSSS was first founded. According to record, the paper was designed to provide awareness of the budding MSSS but it eventually evolved to encompass local campus events, up-coming projects, current news in Social Science, and other related fields. The editors have historically been paid employees of the MSSS while not being a member of its executive council. As such, there has been a stipulation that no executive of the MSSS could ever be the editor during their term. However, executives are often encouraged to write articles for the paper and all students of the faculty of Social Science are welcome to submit work for the paper to include. The Frontline is no longer being produced.

== Frontline Editors ==
- (2010/2011) : Rohan Nair, Medina Abdelkader, and Stephanie Lau
- (2009/2010): Sammy Truong, Alicia Cameron, and Stephanie Lau
- (2007–2009): Danielle Lorenz
- (2007): Zac Spicer
- (2006/2007): Zac Spicer, Sara de Souza
- (2005/2006): Amanda Pokoyoway
- (2004/2005): Amanda Pokoyoway, Jim McKeown
