= DeGroote School of Business =

Faculty at McMaster University in Canada

Coordinates: 43.2642°N 79.9165°W

- Former name: School of Business (1952–1992)
- Type: Public business school
- Established: 1952; 74 years ago
- Parent institution: McMaster University
- Dean: Khaled Hassanein
- Location: Hamilton, Ontario, Canada
- Named for: Michael G. DeGroote
- Website: degroote.mcmaster.ca

The DeGroote School of Business is one of six faculties at McMaster University in Hamilton, Ontario, Canada. The School of Business was founded in 1952 but was renamed in 1992 in honour of successful Canadian entrepreneur and philanthropist Michael G. DeGroote. The DeGroote school offers (Hon) B.Commerce, MBA and Ph.D. degrees.

The current dean is Dr. Khaled Hassanein.

The business school is accredited by the Association to Advance Collegiate Schools of Business (AACSB).

== Commerce program ==
The school offers a Bachelor of Commerce degree. The program's first two years provide a foundation of business, while the latter two years are for specialization in a functional business area. Once students have completed their second year at the school, they are then admitted to either the honours commerce program or to the regular B.Comm program. To enter into the honours program, students must have completed all required courses with no failures and have a cumulative average of at least 5.0. After the third year, DeGroote Commerce students have an internship option, with a term of 12 to 16 months. Partners for the internship program include Procter & Gamble, RBC, CIBC, CPPIB, Dofasco, Manulife, Deloitte, IBM, Microsoft, Ford and others.

== MBA program ==
The MBA program was introduced in 1962 and in 1973, the Co-op MBA option was added. DeGroote is differentiated from other Canadian business schools by its focus on experiential learning through co-op. Also unique to DeGroote is a specialization in Health Services Management. A typical graduating class consists of 30% Finance, 30% Health, and 25% Marketing majors; the school also offers Accounting, Strategic Business Valuation, eBusiness, Innovation & New Technology, Operations Management, Information Systems and Human Resources streams. Because of the co-op option, the school's average age is relatively young (typically 25–26 at admission); the co-op MBA is the longest full-time MBA in Canada, at 28 months.

== Master of Finance Program ==
The Master of Finance program at the DeGroote School of Business provides students with an in-depth training in finance, emphasizing the development of the analytical skills required to address the increasingly complex problems faced by the financial industry.

== Allen H. Gould Trading Floor ==
The school also houses the Allen H. Gould Trading Floor, an educational tool that enables students to experience the relationships and interactions of the financial markets. It is one of the first such facilities in North America, one of three in Canada, and one of only 30 in the world.

== Suspensions ==
In 2013, a tribunal made up of 3 professors recommended suspensions for five tenured professors due to violations of the school's anti-discrimination policy. Other faculty members protested the suspensions. An Ontario court later reduced the suspensions and ordered compensation.
