= Catholic Church and health care =

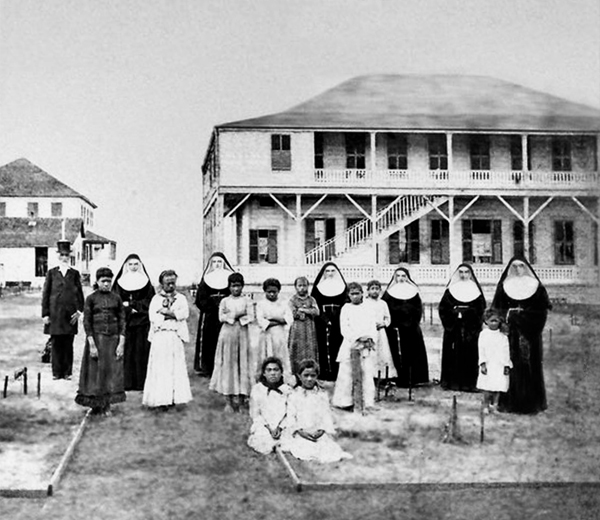
Marianne Cope and other Sisters of St Francis with the daughters of leper patients, at the Kakaʻako Branch Hospital, Hawaii, 1886. The Catholic Church established many of the world's modern hospitals.

The Catholic Church is the largest non-government provider of health care services in the world. It has around 18,000 clinics, 16,000 homes for the elderly and those with special needs, and 5,500 hospitals, with 65 percent of them located in developing countries. In 2010, the Church's Pontifical Council for the Pastoral Care of Health Care Workers said that the Church manages 26% of the world's health care facilities. The Church's involvement in health care has ancient origins.

Jesus Christ, whom the Church holds as its founder, instructed his followers to heal the sick. The early Christians were noted for tending the sick and infirm, and Christian emphasis on practical charity gave rise to the development of systematic nursing and hospitals. The influential Benedictine rule holds that "the care of the sick is to be placed above and before every other duty, as if indeed Christ were being directly served by waiting on them". During the Middle Ages, monasteries and convents were the key medical centres of Europe and the Church developed an early version of a welfare state. The USCCB holds that an increase in the acceptance of Hippocratic Oath violations leads to killing rather than seeking cures. Cathedral schools evolved into a well integrated network of medieval universities and Catholic scientists (many of them clergymen) made a number of important discoveries which aided the development of modern science and medicine.

Albert the Great (1206–1280) was a pioneer of biological field research and is a saint within the Catholic Church; Desiderius Erasmus (1466–1536) helped revive knowledge of ancient Greek medicine, Renaissance popes were often patrons of the study of anatomy, and Catholic artists such as Michelangelo advanced knowledge of the field through sketching cadavers. The Jesuit Athanasius Kircher (1602–1680) first proposed that living beings enter and exist in the blood (a precursor of germ theory). The Augustinian Gregor Mendel (1822–1884) developed theories on genetics for the first time. As Catholicism became a global religion, the Catholic orders and religious and lay people established health care centres around the world. Women's religious institutes such as the Sisters of Charity, Sisters of Mercy and Sisters of St Francis opened and operated some of the first modern general hospitals.

While the prioritization of charity and healing by early Christians created the hospital, their spiritual emphasis tended to imply "the subordination of medicine to religion and doctor to priest". "Physic and faith", wrote historian of medicine Roy Porter "while generally complementary... sometimes tangled in border disputes." Similarly in modern times, the moral stance of the Church against contraception and abortion has been a source of controversy. The Church, while being a major provider of health care to HIV AIDS sufferers, and of orphanages for unwanted children, has been criticized for opposing condom use. Due to Catholics' belief in the sanctity of life from conception, IVF, which leads to the destruction of many embryos, surrogacy, which relies on IVF, and embryonic stem-cell research, which necessitates the destruction of embryos, are among other areas of controversy for the Church in the provision of health care.

== Theological basis: euntes docete et curate infirmos ==
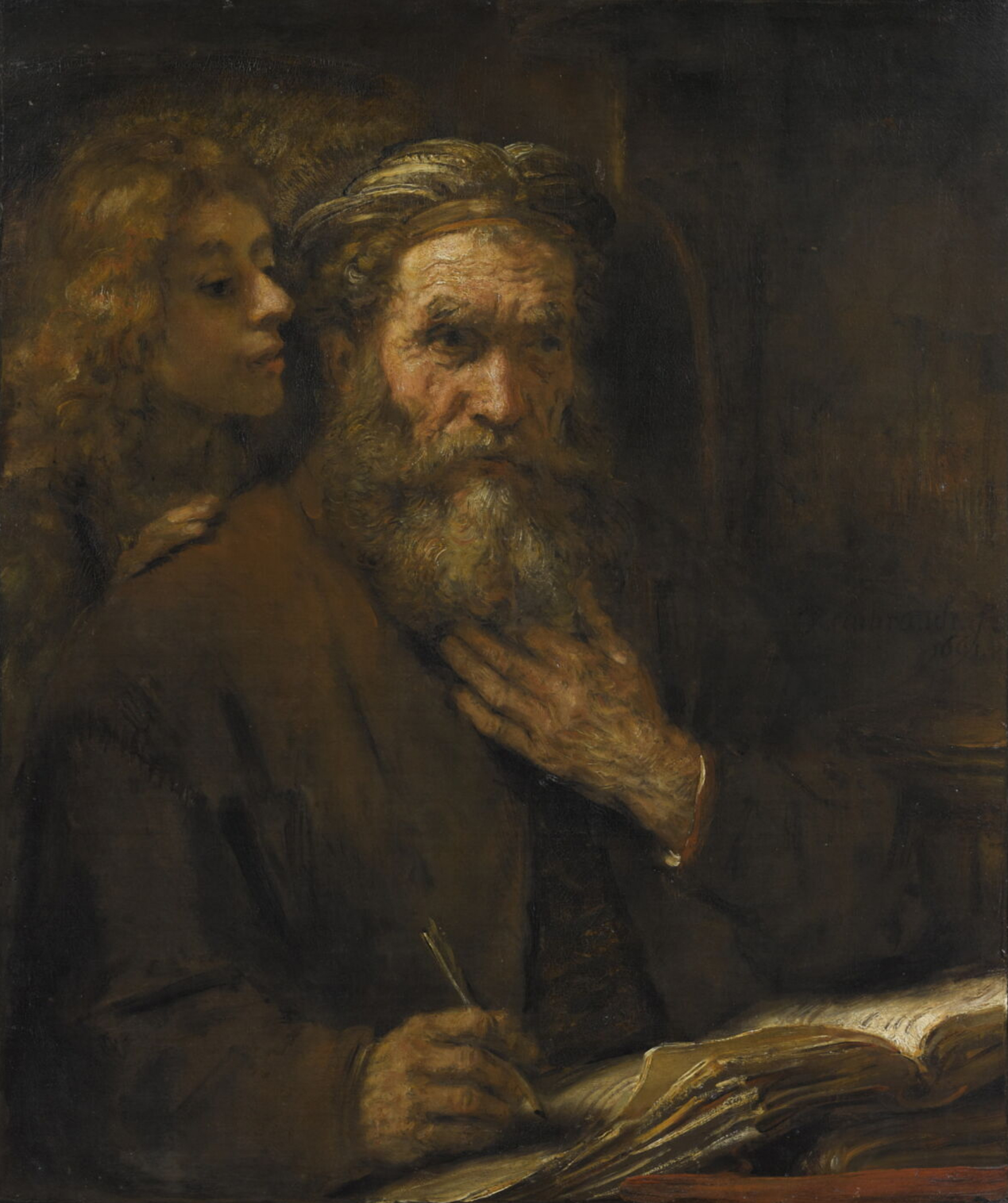
St Matthew the Evangelist and an Angel, 1661, by Rembrandt. The Gospel of Matthew states that Jesus wanted his followers to care for the sick.

Catholic social teaching urges concern for the sick. Jesus Christ, whom the church holds as its founder, placed a particular emphasis on care for the sick and outcast, such as lepers. According to the New Testament, he and his Apostles went about curing the sick and anointing of the sick. According to the Parable of the Sheep and the Goats, which is found in Matthew 25, Jesus identified so strongly with the sick and afflicted that he equated serving them with serving him:

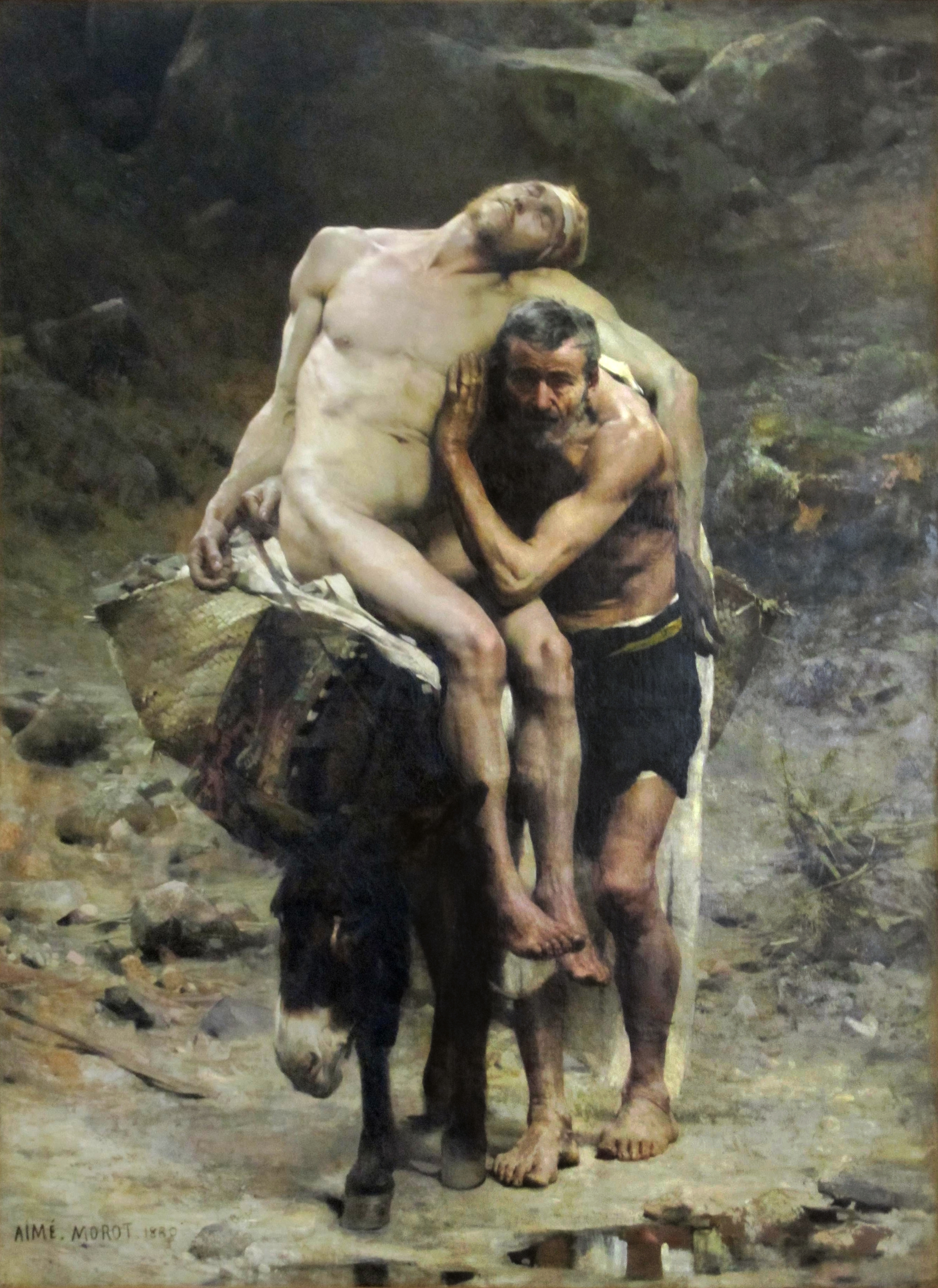
The Good Samaritan by Aimé Morot (1880) illustrates Jesus' Parable of the Good Samaritan told in Luke.

For I was hungry and you fed me, thirsty and you gave me drink. I was a stranger and you received me in your homes. Naked and you clothed me. I was sick and you took care of me, in prison and you visited me [...] [W]hatever you did for one of these least brothers of mine, you did for me.

In a 2013 presentation to its twenty-seventh international conference in 2013, the President of the Pontifical Council for the Pastoral Care of Health Care Workers, Zygmunt Zimowski, said that "The Church, adhering to the mandate of Jesus, 'Euntes docete et curate infirmos' (Mt 10:6-8, Go, preach and heal the sick), during the course of her history, which by now has lasted two millennia, has always attended to the sick and the suffering."

In orations such as his Sermon on the Mount and stories such as the Parable of the Good Samaritan, Jesus called on followers to worship God (Romans 12:1–2) through care for one's neighbor: the sick, hungry and poor. Such teachings formed the foundation of Catholic Church involvement in hospitals and health care.

According to James Joseph Walsh, writing in the Catholic Encyclopedia:

Christ Himself gave His followers the example of caring for the sick by the numerous miracles He wrought to heal various forms of disease including the most loathsome, leprosy. He also charged His Apostles in explicit terms to heal the sick (Luke 10:9) and promised to those who should believe in Him that they would have power over disease (Mark 16:18) [...] Like the other works of Christian charity, the care of the sick was from the beginning a sacred duty for each of the faithful, but it devolved in a special way upon the bishops, presbyters, and deacons. The same ministrations that brought relief to the poor naturally included provision for the sick who were visited in their homes.

The Benedictine rule, which led the profusion of medieval hospitals founded by the Church, requires that "the care of the sick is to be placed above and before every other duty, as if indeed Christ were being directly served by waiting on them".

== History ==
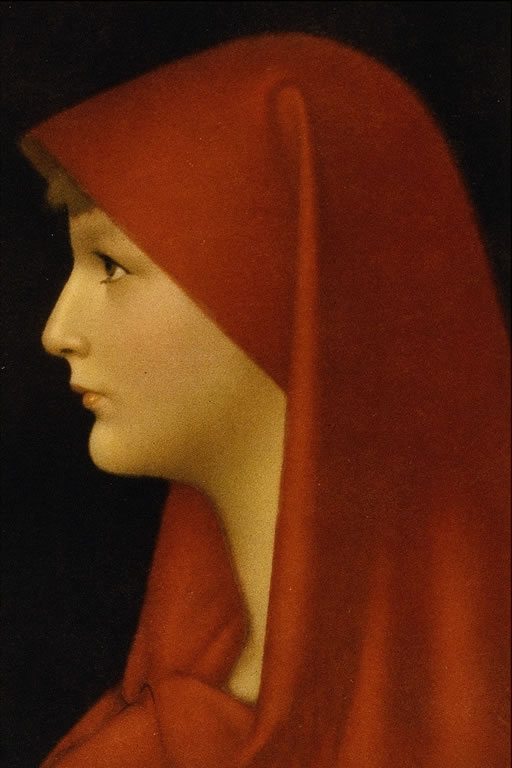
Saint Fabiola founded a hospital at Rome around 400 AD.

=== Antiquity ===
Ancient Greek and Roman medicine developed solid foundations over seven centuries, creating, Porter wrote, "the ideal of a union of science, philosophy and practical medicine in the learned physician...". But Greek and Roman religion did not preach of a duty to tend to the sick. Christianity emerged into this world as a Jewish sect in the mid-1st century and early Christians from the outset went about tending the sick and infirm. Their priests were often also physicians. St Luke the Evangelist, credited as one of the authors of The New Testament, was a physician. Christian emphasis on practical charity was to give rise to the development of systematic nursing and hospitals after the end of the persecution of the early church.

The early Christian outlook on sickness drew on various traditions, including Eastern asceticism and Jewish healing traditions, while the New Testament wrote of Jesus and his Apostles as healers. Porter wrote: "While suffering and disease could appear as chastisement of the wicked or a trial of those the Lord loved, the Church also developed a healing mission". Pagan religions seldom offered help to the sick, but the early Christians were willing to nurse the sick and take food to them. Notably during the smallpox epidemic of 165–180 AD and the measles outbreak of around 250 AD, "In nursing the sick and dying, regardless of religion, the Christians won friends and sympathisers", wrote historian Geoffrey Blainey.

Hospitality was considered an obligation of Christian charity and bishops' houses and the valetudinaria of wealthier Christians were used to tend the sick. Deacons were assigned the task of distributing alms, and in Rome by 250 AD the Church had developed an extensive charitable outreach, with wealthy converts supporting the poor. It is believed that the first church hospitals were constructed in the East, and only later in the Latin West. An early hospital may have been built at Constantinople during the age of Constantine by St. Zoticus. St. Basil built a famous hospital at Cæsarea in Cappadocia, later called Basileias, which "had the dimensions of a city". In the West, Saint Fabiola founded a hospital at Rome around 400. Saint Jerome wrote that Fabiola founded a hospital and "assembled all the sick from the streets and highways" and "personally tended the unhappy and impoverished victims of hunger and disease... washed the pus from sores that others could not even behold"

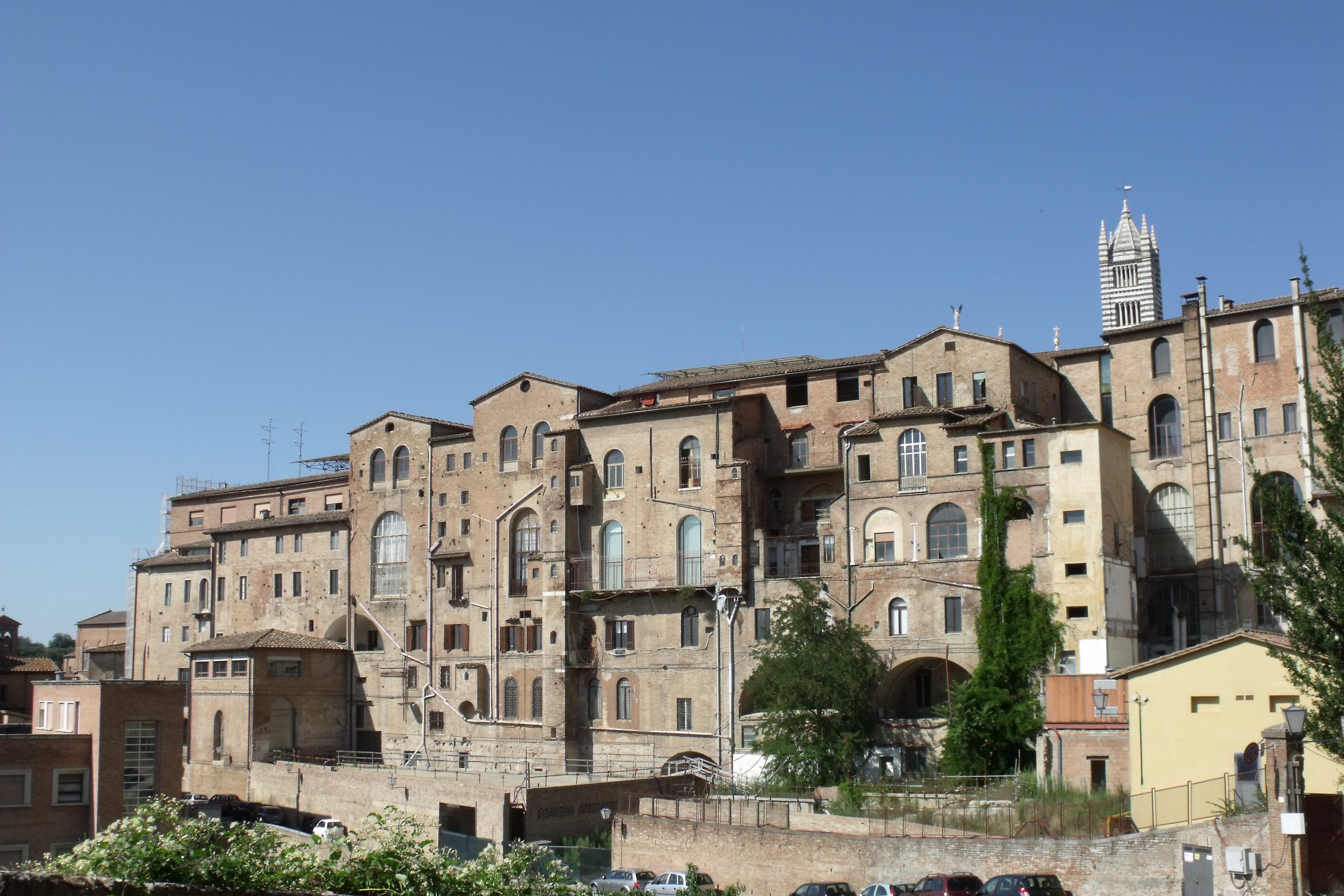
Panorama of Siena's Santa Maria della Scala Hospital, one of Europe's oldest hospitals

Several early Christian healers are honoured as Saints in the Catholic tradition. Cosmas and Damian, brothers from Cilicia in Asia Minor, supplanted the pagan Asclepius as the patron saints of medicine and were celebrated for their healing powers.." Said to have lived in the late third century AD and to have performed a miraculous first leg transplant on a patient, and later martyred under the Emperor Diocletian, Cosmas and Damian appear in the heraldry of barber-surgeon companies.." Notable contributors to the medical sciences of those early centuries include Tertullian (born 160 AD), Clement of Alexandria, Lactantius and the learned St. Isidore of Seville (d. 636). St. Benedict of Nursia (480) emphasised medicine as an aid to the provision of hospitality. The martyr Saint Pantaleon was said to be physician to the Emperor Galerius, who sentenced him to death for his Christianity. Since the Middle Ages, Pantaleon has been considered a patron saint of physicians and midwives.

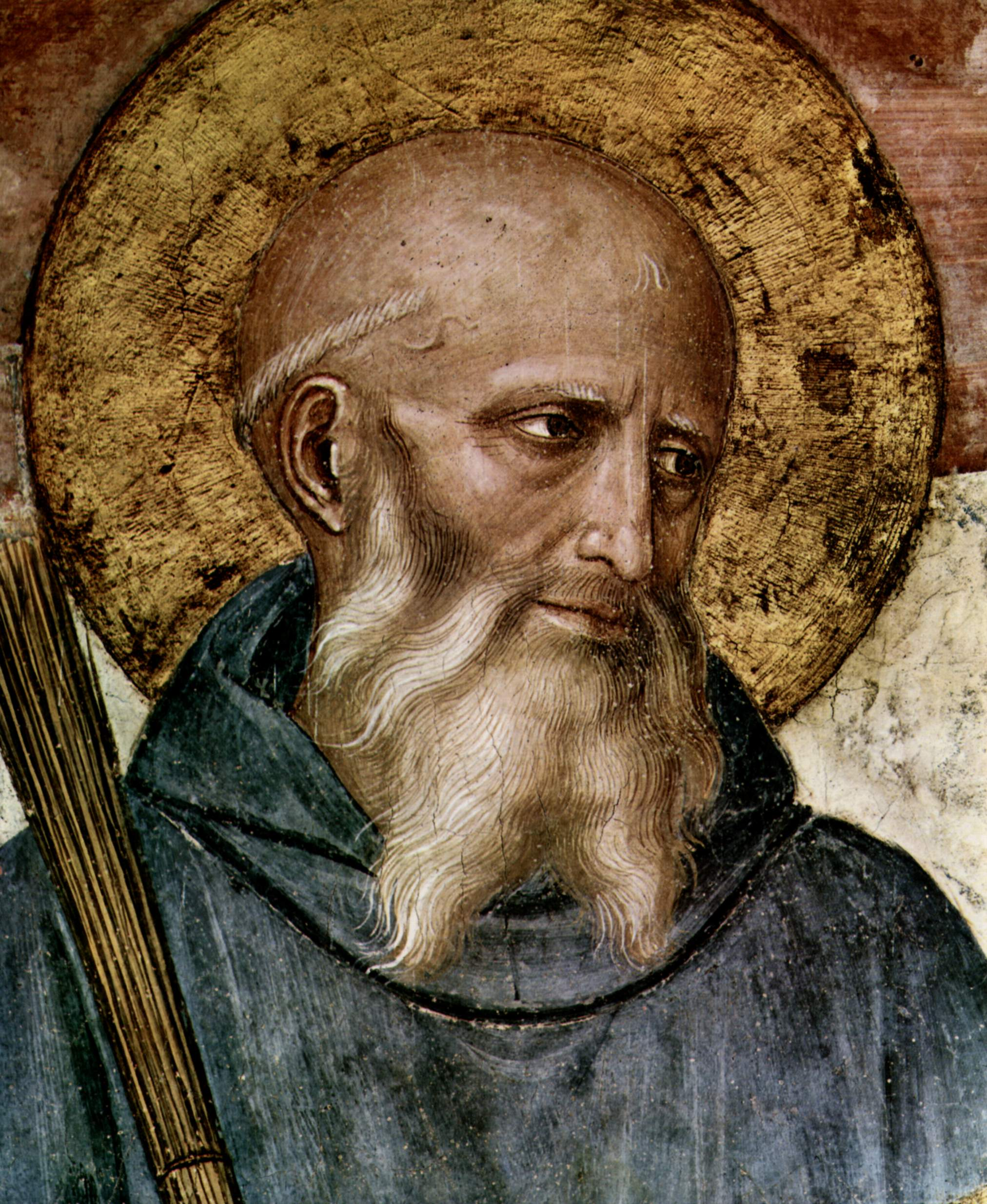
Saint Benedict of Nursia

The administration of the Eastern and Western Roman Empires split and the demise of the Western Empire by the sixth century was accompanied by a series of violent invasions, and precipitated the collapse of cities and civic institutions of learning, along with their links to the learning of classical Greece and Rome. For the next thousand years, medical knowledge would change very little.." A scholarly medical tradition maintained itself in the more stable East, but in the West, scholarship virtually disappeared outside of the Church, where monks were aware of a dwindling range of medical texts.." The legacy of this early period was, in the words of Porter, that "Christianity planted the hospital: the well-endowed establishments of the Levant and the scattered houses of the West shared a common religious ethos of charity.".

=== Middle Ages ===
Geoffrey Blainey likened the Catholic Church in its activities during the Middle Ages to an early version of a welfare state: "It conducted hospitals for the old and orphanages for the young; hospices for the sick of all ages; places for the lepers; and hostels or inns where pilgrims could buy a cheap bed and meal". It supplied food to the population during famine and distributed food to the poor. This welfare system the church funded through collecting taxes on a large scale and possessing large farmlands and estates. It was common for monks and clerics to practice medicine and medical students in northern European universities often took minor Holy orders. Mediaeval hospitals had a strongly Christian ethos and were, in the words of historian of medicine Roy Porter, "religious foundations through and through"; ecclesiastical regulations were passed to govern medicine, partly to prevent clergymen profiting from medicine.

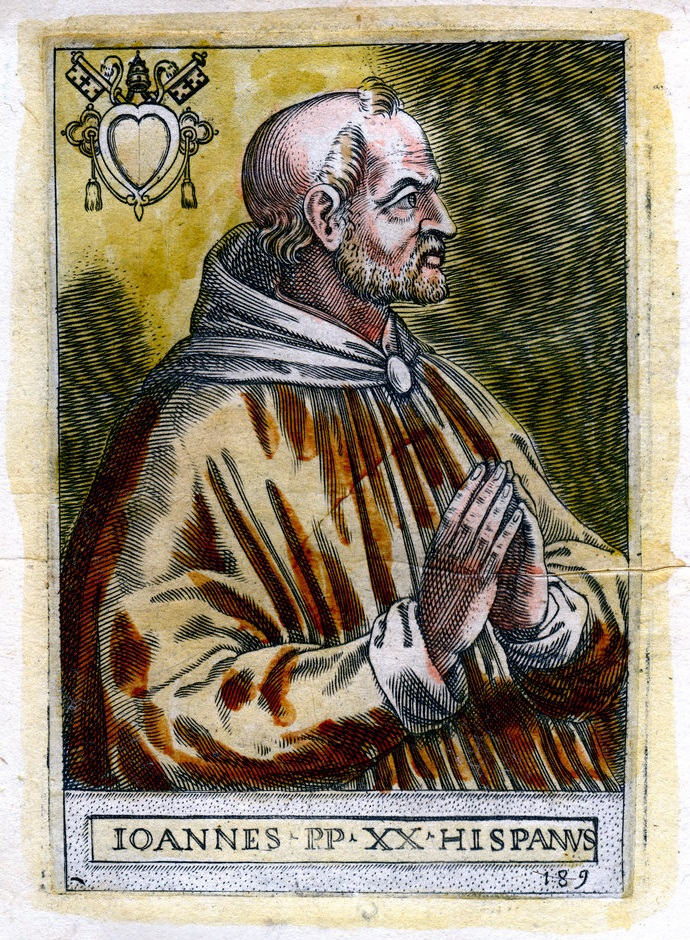
John XXI was a medieval pope and physician who wrote popular medical texts.

After a period of decline, the Holy Roman Emperor Charlemagne had decreed that a hospital should be attached to each cathedral and monastery. Following his death, the hospitals again declined, but by the tenth century monasteries were the leading providers of hospital work – among them the Benedictine Abbey of Cluny. Charlemagne's decree required each monastery and Cathedral chapter to establish a school and in these schools medicine was commonly taught. Gerbert of Aurillac (c. 946 – 12 May 1003), known to history as Pope Sylvester II, taught medicine at one such school. Petrus of Spain (1210–1277) was a physician who wrote the popular Treasury of the Poor medical text and became Pope John XXI in 1276.

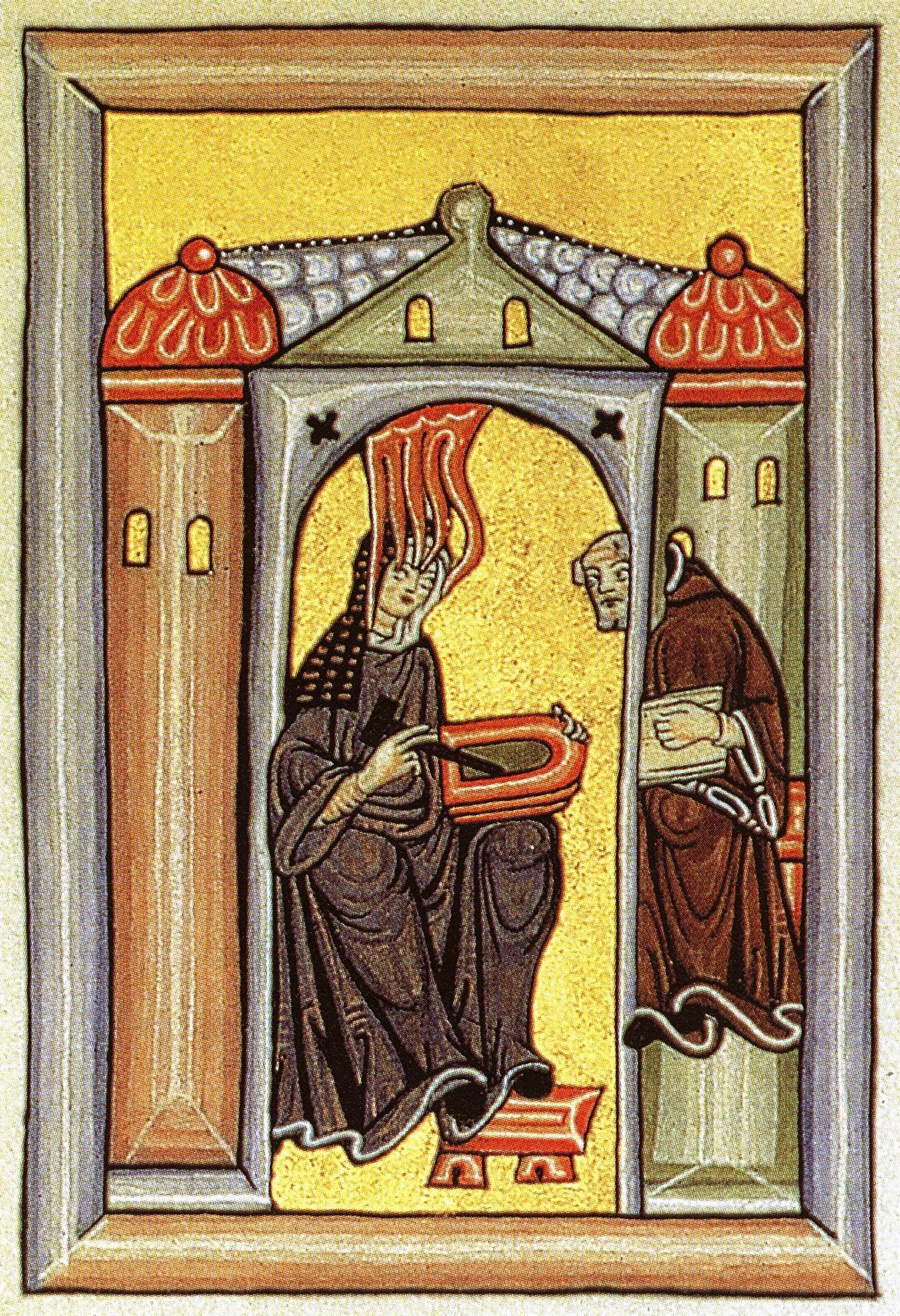
St Hildegard of Bingen dictating to a scribe. Hildegarde is recognised as a doctor of the church, and was among the most distinguished of Medieval Catholic women scientists.

Other famous physicians and medical researchers of the Middle Ages include the Abbot of Monte Cassino Bertharius, the Abbot of Reichenau Walafrid Strabo, the Abbess St Hildegard of Bingen and the Bishop of Rennes Marbodus of Angers. Monasteries of this era were diligent in the study of medicine, and often too were convents. Hildegard of Bingen, a doctor of the church, is among the most distinguished of Medieval Catholic women scientists. Other than theological works, Hildegard also wrote Physica, a text on the natural sciences, as well as Causae et Curae. Hildegard was well known for her healing powers involving practical application of tinctures, herbs, and precious stones.

In keeping with the Benedictine rule that the care of the sick be placed above all other duties, monasteries were the key medical care providers prior to 1300. Most monasteries offered shelter for pilgrims and an infirmary for sick monks, while separate hospitals were founded for the public. The Benedictine order was noted for setting up hospitals and infirmaries in their monasteries, growing medical herbs and becoming the chief medical care givers of their districts. The Capuchin monks sought a revival of the ideals of Francis of Assisi, offering care after plague struck at Camerino in 1523.

Healing shrines were established and different saints came to be invoked for every body part in the hope of miraculous cures. Some of the shrines remain to the present day, and were in the Middle Ages great centres for pilgrims, complete with relics and souvenirs. St Luke or St Michael were invoked for various ailments, and a host of saints for individuals conditions, including St Roch as a protector against plague. St Roch is venerated as one who provided care to plague suffers, only to fall sick himself and be "healed by an angel". Through the devastating Bubonic Plague, the Franciscans were notable for tending the sick. The apparent impotence of medical knowledge against the disease prompted critical examination. Medical scientists came to divide among anti-Galenists, anti-Arabists and positive Hippocratics.

Crusader orders established several new traditions of Catholic medical care. The famous Knights Hospitaller arose as a group of individuals associated with an Amalfitan hospital in Jerusalem, which was built to provide care for poor, sick or injured pilgrims to the Holy Land. Following the capture of the city by Crusaders, the order became a military as well as infirmarian order. The Knights of St John of Jerusalem were later known as the Knights of Malta. The Knights Templar and Teutonic Knights established hospitals around the Mediterranean and through Germanic lands.

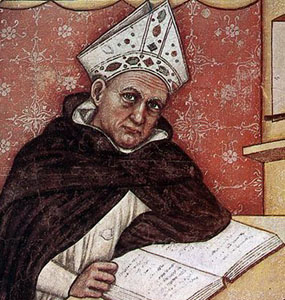
Saint Albert Magnus was a pioneer of biological field research.

Non-military orders of brothers also took up the service of the infirm. By the 15th century, the brothers of the Order of the Holy Spirit were providing care across Europe, and by the sixteenth century the Spanish-founded Order of St John of God had set up about 200 hospitals in the Americas. In Catholic Spain amidst the early Reconquista, Archbishop Raimund founded an institution for translations, which employed a number of Jewish translators to communicate the works of Arabian medicine. Influenced by the rediscovery of Aristotelian thought, churchmen like the Dominican Albert Magnus and the Franciscan Roger Bacon made significant advances in the observation of nature.

Small hospitals for pilgrims sprung up in the West during the early Middle Ages, but by the latter part of the period had grown more substantial, with hospitals founded for lepers, pilgrims, the sick, aged and poor. Milan, Siena, Paris and Florence had numerous and large hospitals. "Within hospitals walls", wrote Porter, "the Christian ethos was all pervasive". From just 12 beds in 1288, the Sta Maria Nuova in Florence "gradually expanded by 1500 to a medical staff of ten doctors, a pharmacist, and several assistants, including female surgeons", and was boasted of as the "first hospital among Christians".

Clergy were active at the School of Salerno, the oldest medical school in Western Europe – among the important churchmen to teach there were Alpuhans, later (1058–1085) Archbishop of Salerno, and the influential Constantine of Carthage, a monk who produced superior translations of Hippocrates and investigated Arab literature. Cathedral schools began in the Early Middle Ages as centers of advanced education, some of them ultimately evolving into medieval universities. The medieval universities of Western Christendom were well-integrated across all of Western Europe, encouraged freedom of enquiry and produced a great variety of fine scholars and natural philosophers, including Robert Grosseteste of the University of Oxford, an early expositor of a systematic method of scientific experimentation, and Saint Albert the Great, a pioneer of biological field research. Porter wrote that, "The great age of hospital building from around 1200 coincided with the flourishing of universities in Italy, Spain, France and England, sustained by the new wealth of the High Middle Ages. ... The Universities extended the work of Salerno in medical education".

=== Renaissance ===
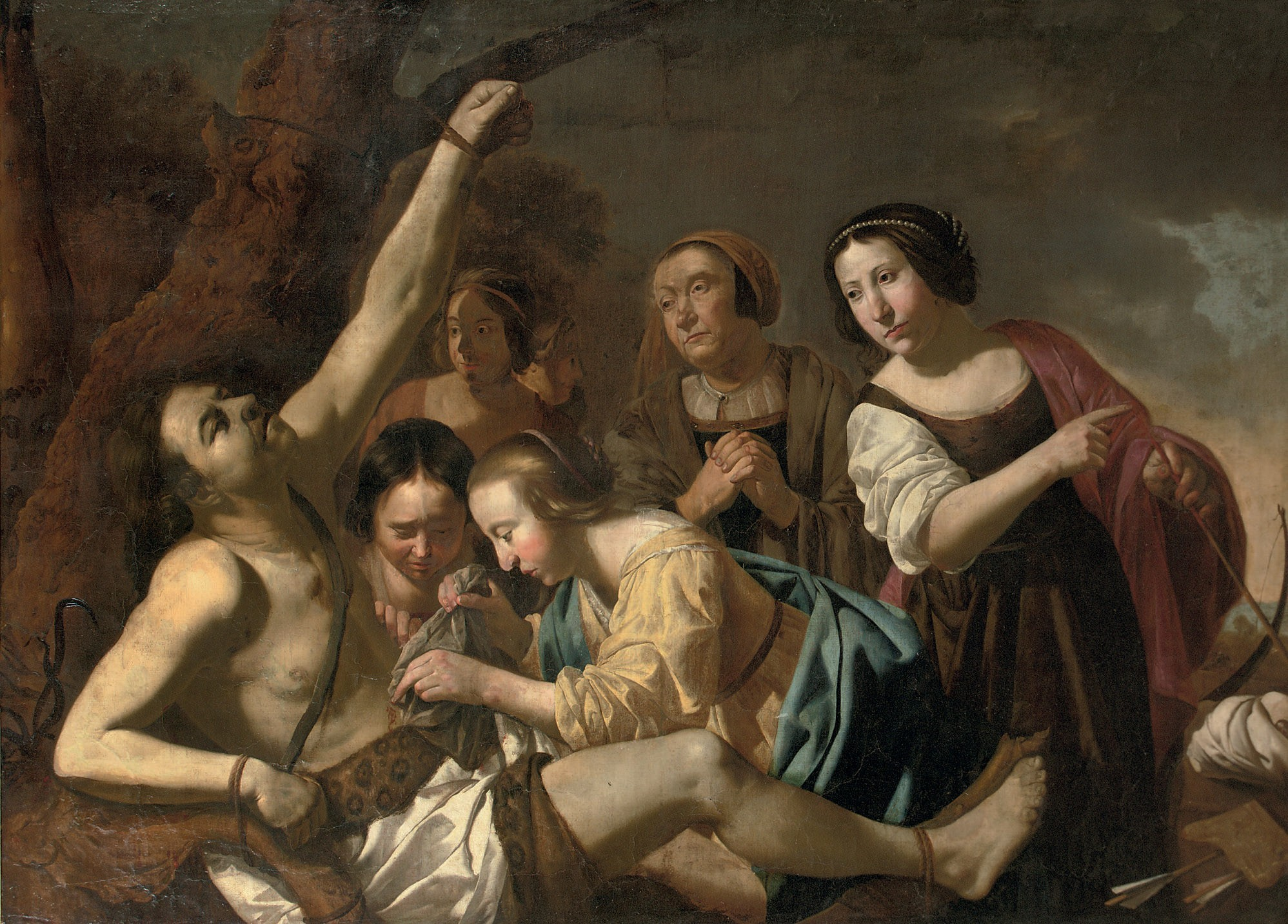
The subject of Saint Sebastian Tended by Saint Irene, here by Jan van Bijlert, c. 1620s, became popular in art in the early 17th century, connected with fears of plague and the encouragement of nursing.

From the 14th century, the European Renaissance saw a revival of interest in Classical learning in Western Europe, coupled with and fuelled by the spread of new inventions like the printing press. The Fall of Constantinople brought refugee scholars from the Greek East to the West. The Catholic scholar Desiderius Erasmus (1466–1536) was interested in medicine and influential in reviving Greek as a language of learning, and the study of the pre-Christian works of Galen. Roy Porter wrote that "after centuries where the Church had taught mankind to renounce worldly goods, for the sake of eternity, Renaissance man showed an insatiable curiosity for the materiality of the here and now...".

In Renaissance Italy, the Popes were often patrons of the study of anatomy and Catholic artists such as Michelangelo advanced knowledge of the field through such studies as sketching cadavers to improve his portraits of the crucifixion. It is often wrongly asserted that the papacy banned dissection during the period, though in fact the directive of Pope Sixtus IV of 1482 to the University of Tübingen said that the Church had no objection to anatomy studies, provided the bodies belonged to an executed criminal, and was given a religious burial once examinations were completed.

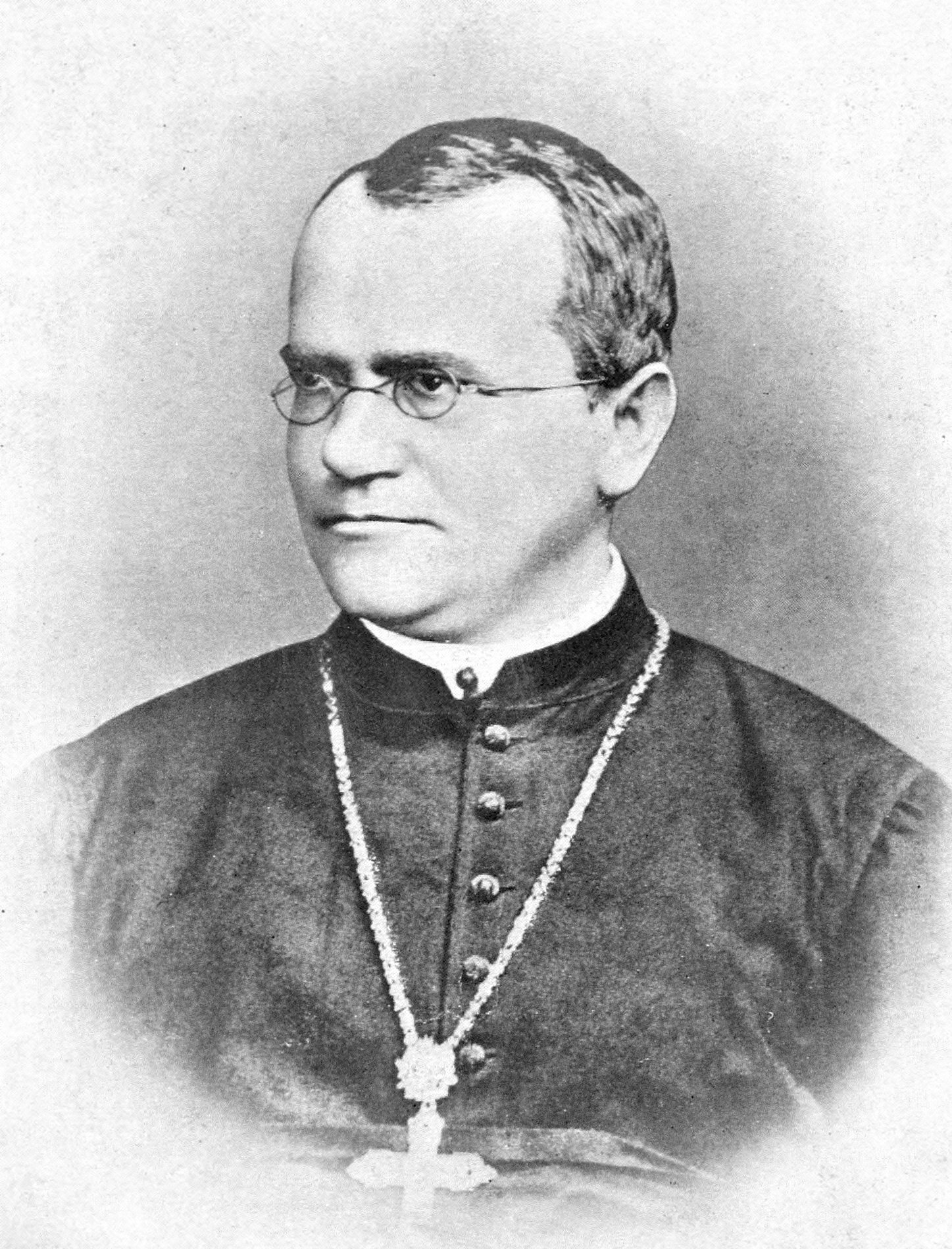
Gregor Mendel, Augustinian Friar and scientist, who developed theories on genetics for the first time

=== Development of modern medicine ===
In modern times, the Catholic Church is the largest non-government provider of health care in the world. Catholic religious have been responsible for founding and running networks of hospitals across the world where medical research continues to be advanced. In 2013, Robert Calderisi wrote that the Catholic Church has around 18,000 clinics, 16,000 homes for the elderly and those with special needs, and 5,500 hospitals – with 65 per cent of them located in developing countries.

==== Europe ====
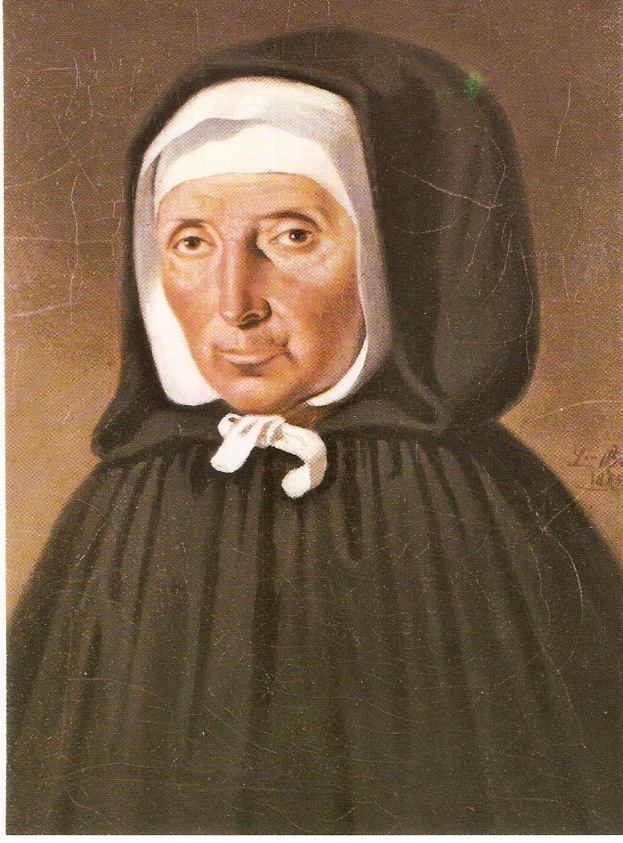
The French Saint Jeanne Jugan (1792–1879) founded the Little Sisters of the Poor who specialise in care for the aged.

Catholic scientists in Europe (many of them clergymen) made a number of important discoveries which aided the development of modern science and medicine. Catholic women were also among the first female professors of medicine, as with Trotula of Salerno the 11th century physician and Dorotea Bucca who held a chair of medicine and philosophy at the University of Bologna. The Jesuit order, created during the Reformation, contributed a number of distinguished medical scientists. In the field of bacteriology it was the Jesuit Athanasius Kircher (1671) who first proposed that living beings enter and exist in the blood (a precursor of germ theory). In the development of ophthalmology, Christoph Scheiner made important advances in relation to refraction of light and the retinal image.

Gregor Mendel, an Austrian scientist and Augustinian friar, began experimenting with peas around 1856. Mendel had joined the Brno Augustinian Monastery in 1843, but also trained as a scientist at the Olmutz Philosophical Institute and the University of Vienna. The Brno Monastery was a centre of scholarship, with an extensive library and tradition of scientific research. Observing the processes of pollination at his monastery in modern Czechoslovakia, Mendel studied and developed theories pertaining to the field of science now called genetics. Mendel published his results in 1866 in the Journal of the Brno Natural History Society, and is considered the father of modern genetics. Where Charles Darwin's theories suggested a mechanism for improvement of species over generations, Mendel's observations provided explanation for how a new species itself could emerge. Though Darwin and Mendel never collaborated, they were aware of each other's work (Darwin read a paper by Wilhelm Olbers Focke which extensively referenced Mendel). Bill Bryson wrote that "without realizing it, Darwin and Mendel laid the groundwork for all of life sciences in the twentieth century. Darwin saw that all living things are connected, that ultimately they trace their ancestry to a single, common source; Mendel's work provided the mechanism to explain how that could happen".

Catholic religious institutes, notably those for women, developed many hospitals throughout Europe and its empires. Ancient orders like the Dominicans and Carmelites have long lived in religious communities that work in ministries such as education and care of the sick. The Portuguese Saint John of God (d. 1550) founded the Brothers Hospitallers of St. John of God to care for the sick and afflicted. The order built hospitals across Europe and its growing empires. In 1898, John was declared patron of the dying and of all hospitals by Pope Leo XIII. The Italian Saint Camillus de Lellis, considered a patron saint of nurses, was a reformed gambler and soldier who became a nurse and then director of Romes's Hospital of St. James, the hospital for incurables. In 1584 he founded the Camillians to tend to the plague-stricken. Irishwoman Catherine McAuley founded the Sisters of Mercy in Dublin in 1831. Her congregation went on to found schools and hospitals across the globe. Saint Jeanne Jugan founded the Little Sisters of the Poor on the Rule of Saint Augustine to assist the impoverished elderly of the streets of France in the mid-nineteenth century. It too spread around the world.

In 2017, controversy arose when an Associated Press report, which the Vatican criticized, stated that Bambino Gesu (Baby Jesus) Pediatric Hospital, a cornerstone of Italy's health care system and administered by the Holy See, put children at risk between 2008 and 2015 and turned its attention to profit after losing money and expanding services.

==== The Americas ====
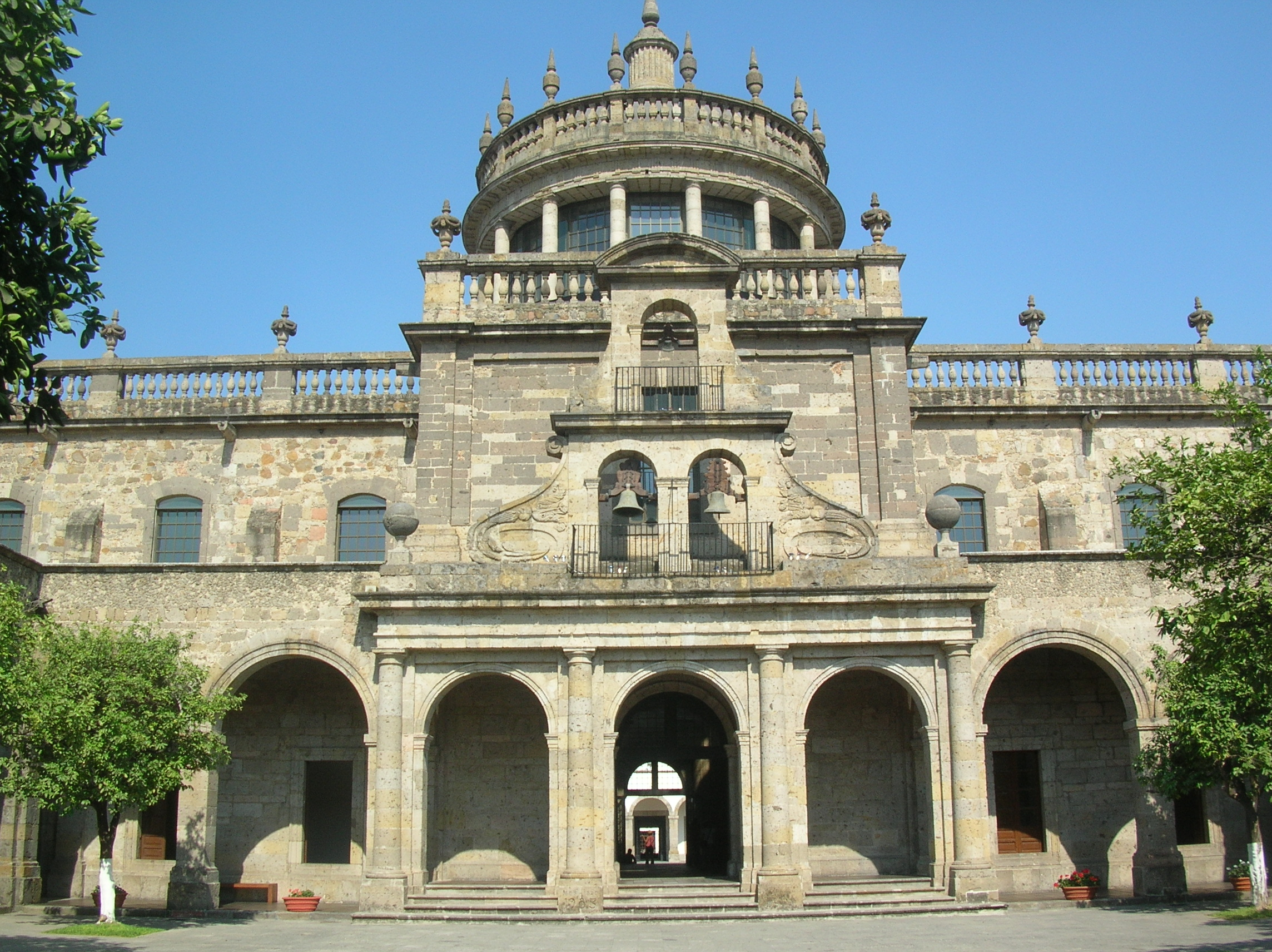
Hospicio Cabañas was the largest hospital in colonial America, in Guadalajara, Mexico.

The Spanish and Portuguese Empires were largely responsible for spreading the Catholic faith and its philosophy regarding health care to South and Central America, where the church established substantial hospital networks.

===== United States =====
Catholic hospitals were established in the United States in the colonial era. The first was probably Charity Hospital, New Orleans, established around 1727. American hospitals in the 19th century were largely designed for poor people in the larger cities. There were no paying patients. Very small proprietary hospitals were operated by practicing physicians and surgeons to take care of their own paying patients in better facilities than the charity hospitals offered. By the 1840s, the major religious denominations, especially the Catholics and Methodists, began opening hospitals in major cities. In the 1840s–1880s era, Catholics in Philadelphia founded two hospitals, for the Irish and German Catholic immigrants. They depended on revenues from the paying sick, and became important health and welfare institutions in the Catholic community. By 1900 the Catholics had set up hospitals in most major cities. In New York the Dominicans, Franciscans, Sisters of Charity, and other orders set up hospitals to care primarily for their own ethnic group. By the 1920s they were serving everyone in the neighborhood.

In smaller cities too the Catholics set up hospitals, such as St. Patrick Hospital in Missoula, Montana. The Sisters of Providence opened it in 1873. It was in part funded by the county contract to care for the poor, and also operated a day school and a boarding school. The nuns provided nursing care especially for infectious diseases and traumatic injuries. They also proselytized the patients to attract converts and restore lapsed Catholics back into the Church. They built a larger hospital in 1890. Catholic hospitals were largely owned and staffed by orders of nuns (who took oaths of poverty), as well as unpaid nursing students. When the population of nuns dropped sharply after the 1960s, the hospitals were sold. The Catholic Hospital Association formed in 1915.

The Sisters of Saint Francis of Syracuse, New York, produced Saint Marianne Cope, who opened and operated some of the first general hospitals in the United States, instituting cleanliness standards which influenced the development of America's modern hospital system, and famously taking her nuns to Hawaii to work with Saint Damien of Molokai in the care of lepers. St Damien himself is considered a martyr of charity and model of Catholic humanitarianism for his mission to the lepers of Molokai.

In the 1990s the Catholic Church was still the largest private provider of health care in the United States. During the 1990s, the church provided about one in six hospital beds in America, at around 566 hospitals, most established by nuns. The church has carried a disproportionate number of poor and uninsured patients at its facilities and the American bishops first called for universal health care in America in 1919. The church has been an active campaigner in that cause ever since. In the abortion debate in America, the church has sought to retain the right not to perform abortions in its health care facilities. In 2012, the church operated 12.6% of hospitals in the US, accounting for 15.6% of all admissions, and around 14.5% of hospital expenses ($98.6 billion). Compared to the public system, the church provided greater financial assistance or free care to poor patients, and was a leading provider of various low-profit health services such as breast cancer screenings, nutrition programs, trauma, and care of the elderly.

Catholic medical facilities in the United States have refused treatment which runs counter to Papal teachings. Abortions are not allowed. Contraception is a treatment that is not provided, and some Catholic health care providers have refused to treat complications caused by contraceptives. Those seeking treatment within a Catholic facility may be unaware of these restrictions or unaware that their health provider is connected with the Catholic Church until seeking treatment for such an issue.

==== Asia ====
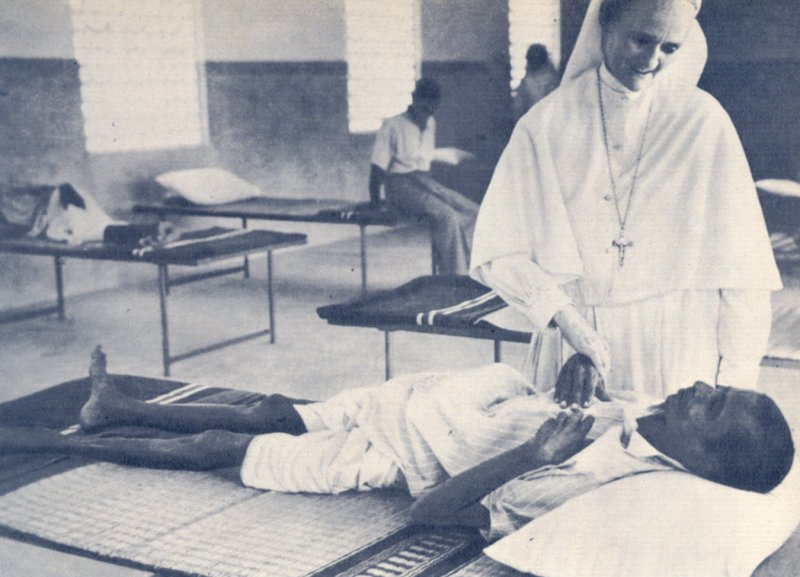
Salesian sister caring for sick and poor in former Madras Presidency, India. Catholic women have been heavily involved as care givers.

During the Middle Ages, Arab medicine was influential on Europe. During Europe's Age of Discovery, Catholic missionaries, notably the Jesuits, introduced the modern sciences to India, China and Japan. Church is a major provider of health care services – especially in Catholic nations like Philippines.

The famous Mother Teresa of Calcutta established the Missionaries of Charity in the slums of Calcutta in 1948 to work among "the poorest of the poor". Initially founding a school, she then gathered other sisters who "rescued new-born babies abandoned on rubbish heaps; they sought out the sick; they took in lepers, the unemployed, and the mentally ill". Teresa achieved fame in the 1960s and began to establish convents around the world. By the time of her death in 1997, the religious institute she founded had more than 450 centres in over 100 countries.

==== Oceania ====
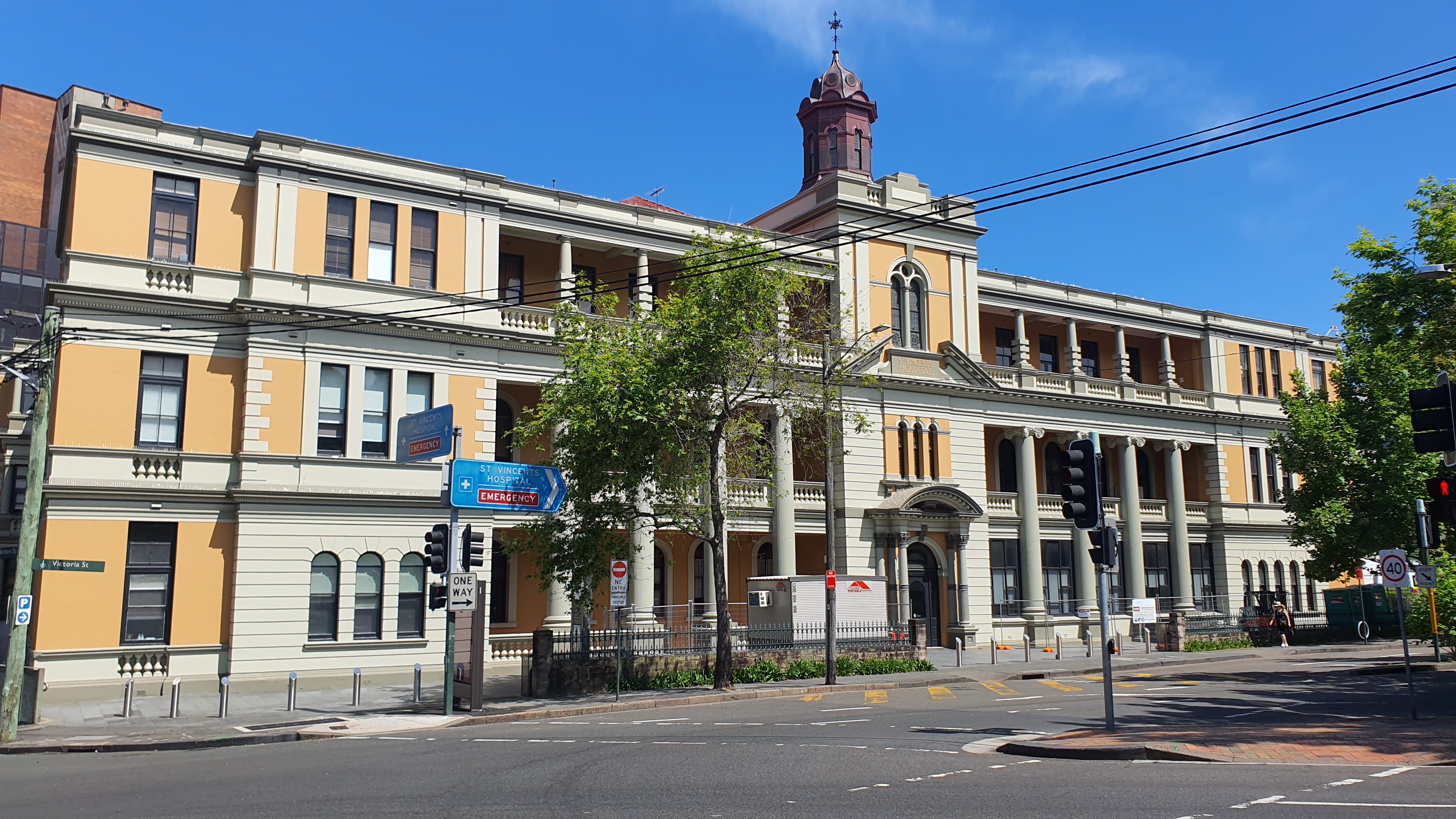
St Vincent's Hospital, Sydney, Australia, was established by the Sisters of Charity and became an early leader in AIDS treatment. It remains among many leading medical research centres established by the Catholic Church around the world.

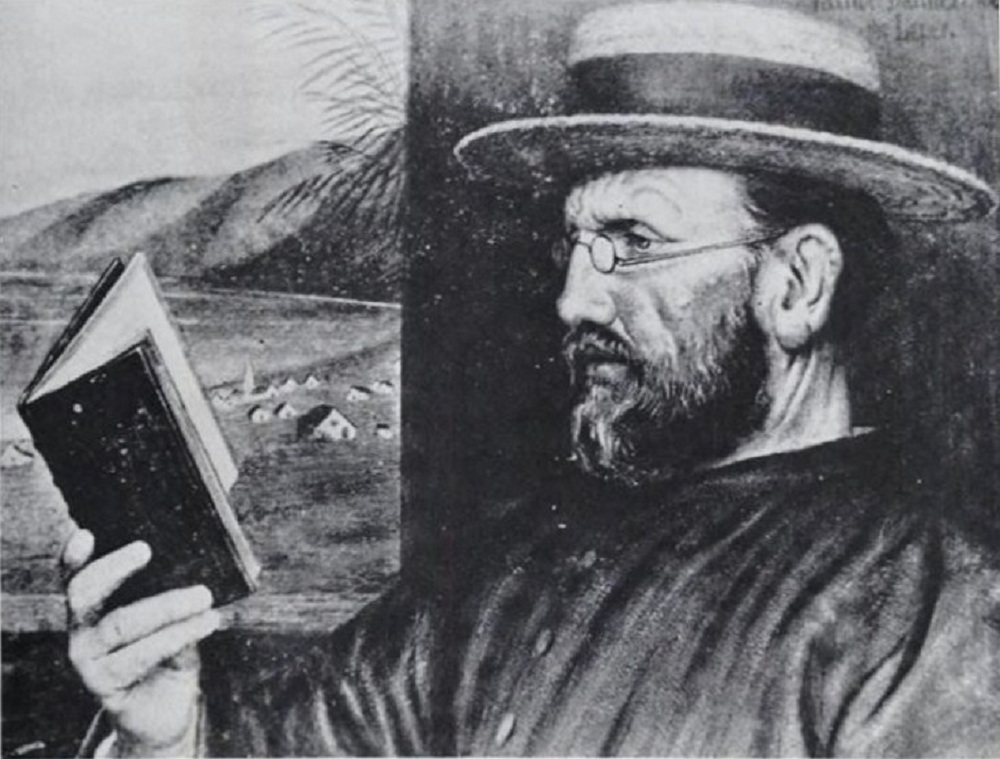
St Damien of Molokai famously established a mission among the lepers of Molokai, Hawaii.

French, Portuguese, British and Irish missionaries brought Catholicism to Oceania and built hospitals and care centres across the region. The church remains not only a key provider of health care in predominantly Catholic nations like East Timor but also in predominantly Protestant and secular nations like Australia and New Zealand.

As restrictions were lifted by British authorities on the practice of Catholicism in colonial Australia, Catholic religious institutes founded many of Australia's hospitals. Irish Sisters of Charity arrived in Sydney in 1838 and established St Vincent's Hospital, Sydney, in 1857 as a free hospital for the poor. The Sisters went on to found hospitals, hospices, research institutes and aged care facilities in Victoria, Queensland and Tasmania. At St Vincent's they trained leading surgeon Victor Chang and opened Australia's first AIDS clinic. In the 21st century, with more and more lay people involved in management, the sisters began collaborating with Sisters of Mercy Hospitals in Melbourne and Sydney. Jointly the group operates four public hospitals; seven private hospitals and 10 aged care facilities.

The Sisters of Mercy arrived in Auckland in 1850 and were the first order of religious sisters to come to New Zealand; they began work in health care and education.

The Sisters of St Joseph was founded in Australia by Australia's first Saint, Mary MacKillop, and Fr Julian Tenison Woods in 1867. MacKillop travelled throughout Australasia and established schools, convents and charitable institutions. The English Sisters of the Little Company of Mary arrived in 1885 and have since established public and private hospitals, retirement living and residential aged care, community care and comprehensive palliative care in New South Wales, the ACT, Victoria, Tasmania, South Australia and the Northern Territory. The Little Sisters of the Poor, who follow the charism of Saint Jeanne Jugan to "offer hospitality to the needy aged" arrived in Melbourne in 1884 and now operate four aged care homes in Australia.

Catholic Health Australia is today the largest non-government provider grouping of health, community and aged care services in Australia. These do not operate for profit and range across the full spectrum of health services, representing about 10% of the health sector and employing 35,000 people. Catholic organisations in New Zealand remain heavily involved in community activities including education, health services, chaplaincy to prisons, rest homes, and hospitals, social justice, and human rights advocacy.

==== Africa ====
Catholicism has grown rapidly in Africa over the last two centuries. As in all other continents, Catholic missionaries established health care centres across the continent – though limitations on Catholic institutions remain in place for much of Muslim North Africa. Caritas Internationalis is the Church's main international aid and development body and operates in over 200 countries and territories and co-operates closely with the United Nations.

===== HIV/AIDS =====
Pope Paul VI issued the Humanae Vitae Encyclical Letter on the Regulation of Birth in 1968, which outlined opposition to "artificial birth control" on the basis that it would open a "wide and easy road ... towards conjugal infidelity and the general lowering of morality". In response to the subsequent AIDS epidemic which emerged from the 1980s onward, the United Nations Population Fund (UNFPA) has argued that "comprehensive condom programming is a key institutional priority ... because condoms ... are recognized as the only currently available and effective way to prevent HIV – and other sexually transmitted infections – among sexually active people". A 2014 report by The U.N. Committee on the Rights of the Child called on the Church to "overcome all the barriers and taboos surrounding adolescent sexuality that hinder their access to sexual and reproductive information, including on family planning and contraceptives".

In Africa today, the church is heavily engaged in providing care to AIDS sufferers amidst the AIDS epidemic. Following the election of Pope Francis in 2013, UNAIDS wrote that the Church "provides support to millions of people living with HIV around the world" and that "Statistics from the Vatican in 2012 indicated that Catholic Church-related organizations provide approximately a quarter of all HIV treatment, care, and support throughout the world and run more than 5,000 hospitals, 18,000 dispensaries and 9,000 orphanages, many involved in AIDS-related activities." UNAIDS co-operates closely with the Church on critical issues such as the elimination of new HIV infections in children and keeping their mothers alive, as well as increasing access to antiretroviral medication.

An article published in The Lancet examining Pope Francis’s influence on global health during the first decade of his papacy discussed HIV prevention and reproductive health. The article noted that, although Pope Francis had demonstrated some flexibility in his statements on responsible parenthood and the use of contraception in specific circumstances, the Catholic Church continued to oppose contraceptive methods, including the use of condoms for contraception.

===== COVID-19 =====
In April 2020, the Vatican's Congregation for the Eastern Churches set up a coronavirus fund to address the health crisis of the COVID-19 pandemic. This was a response to Pope Francis' invitation to "not abandon the suffering, especially the poorest, in facing the global crisis caused by the pandemic."

Catholic Church also supported the government vaccination program by transforming their churches into vaccination sites. Health Secretary Francisco T. Duque affirmed the church's support by saying, ‘we are happy with the CBCP's offer to have churches as vaccination hubs if needed. Churches really can be alternative sites to areas that lack facility, especially those in hard-to-reach municipalities'.

In early March 2020, in the United States, Catholic churches practiced avoiding hugs and handshakes as a precautionary measure against spreading the virus. According to Reverend Jeffery Ott of Our Lady of Lourdes in Atlanta, Georgia, the church had to omit the sharing of wine in the chalice during Holy Communion.

== Contemporary issues ==
=== Bioethics ===
Because the Catholic Church opposes abortion, euthanasia and contraception and other procedures, Catholic health facilities will not provide most or any such services. In public debates, particularly among Western nations like the United States, this has raised questions over insurance public/private financial co-operation and government interference and regulation of health facilities. Writing in 2012, the Australian human rights lawyer and Jesuit Frank Brennan, in response to calls for public funding to Catholic hospitals to be contingent on them offering the "full suites of services", said that:

The nation is the better for policies and funding arrangements that encourage public and private providers of healthcare, including the Churches. The public may need to be patient with Church authorities as they discern appropriate moral responses to new technologies. This is a small price to pay for creative diversity which delivers healthcare of the highest standard with a special character cherished by many citizens, not just Catholics.

The Catholic Church's opposition to abortion has also restricted its hospitals' treatment of miscarriages. In cases where evacuation of the miscarriage from the uterus is medically indicated, doctors have been prohibited from carrying it out while a fetal heartbeat is still present, "in effect delaying care until fetal heart tones cease, the pregnant woman becomes ill, or the patient is transported to a non–Catholic-owned facility for the procedure."

A number of controversies have arisen over the application of these treatments in Catholic hospitals, or the lack thereof; for instance, in the United States, a member of a hospital ethics committee was excommunicated when she approved a therapeutic, direct abortion to save a patient's life, and in Germany a case of two hospitals turning away and refusing to examine or treat a rape victim led to new guidelines from the country's bishops stating that hospitals could provide emergency contraception to victims of rape.

As regards IVF and surrogacy, the Church's teaching, which states that every human life is sacred from conception until natural death, and that the vulnerable should be protected, therefore finds that this technology, which leads to the death of many embryos for each successful pregnancy, to be an abuse of power at the cost of the weakest. However, Catholics have been active in developing alternative treatments for infertility and especially addressing its root causes, which, in addition to causing infertility or risk of miscarriage, are likely to have other consequences on health, such as polyendocrine metabolic ovarian syndrome (PMOS), thyroid conditions and endometriosis.

In 2016, a woman was refused treatment according to the "Ethical and Religious Directives for Catholic Health Care Services" for her dislodged IUD, although she was bleeding, cramping and in pain.

=== Transgender ===
In 2019, a Catholic hospital in Eureka, California, was criticized for not performing a hysterectomy as part of a gender affirming surgery.

== Patron saints ==
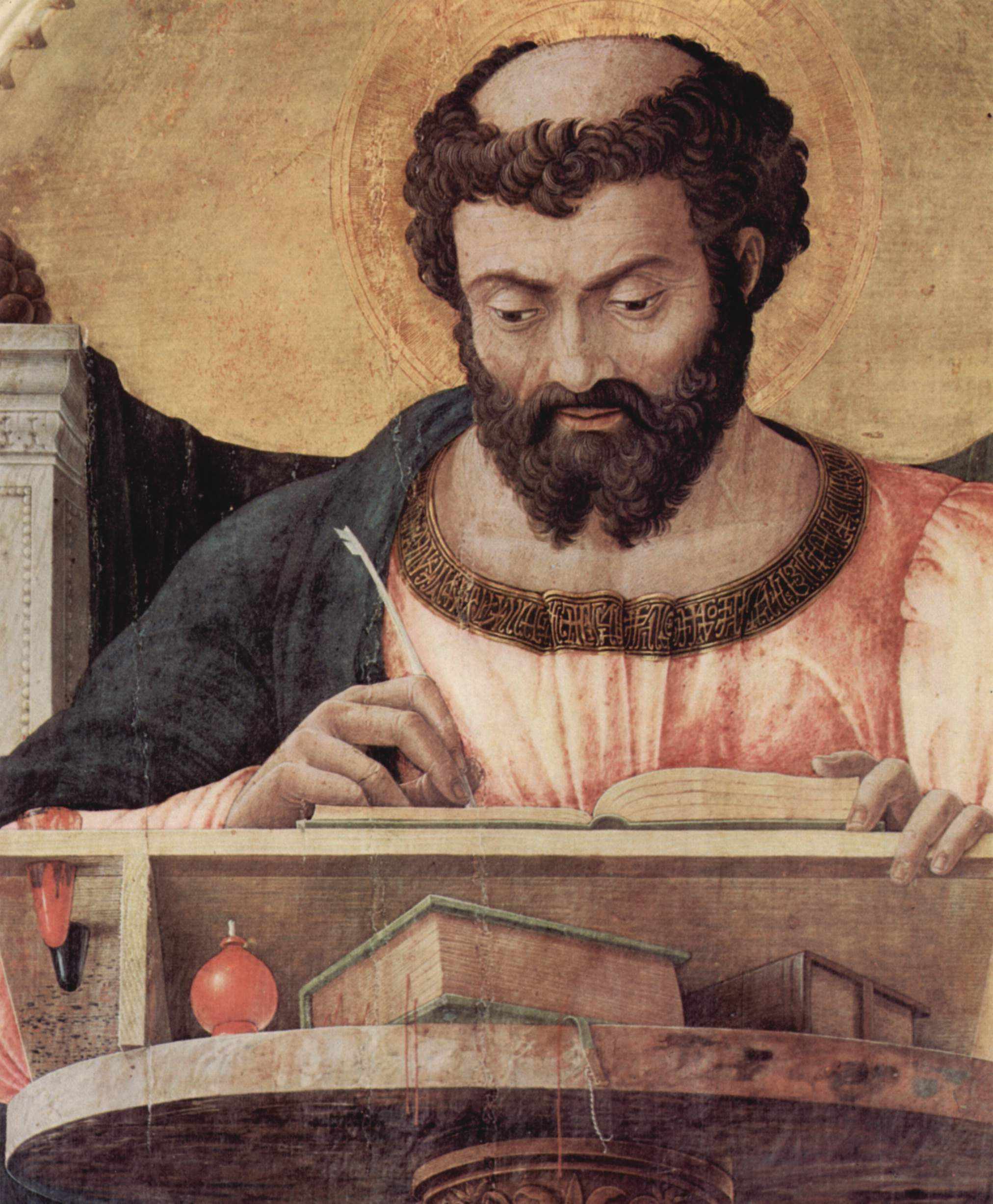
Saint Luke the Evangelist, one of the four writers of the Gospels, was said to be a physician.

=== Physicians ===
There are a number of patron saints for physicians, the most important of whom are Saint Luke the Evangelist, the physician and disciple of Christ; Saints Cosmas and Damian, 3rd-century physicians from Syria; and Saint Pantaleon, a 4th-century physician from Nicomedia. Archangel Raphael is also considered a patron saint of physicians.

=== Surgeons ===
The patron saints for surgeons are Saint Luke the Evangelist, the physician and disciple of Christ, Saints Cosmas and Damian (3rd-century physicians from Syria), Saint Quentin (3rd-century saint from France), Saint Foillan (7th-century saint from Ireland), and Saint Roch (14th-century saint from France).

=== Nurses ===
Various Catholic saints are considered patrons of nursing: Saint Agatha, Saint Alexius, Saint Camillus of Lellis, St Catherine of Alexandria, St Catherine of Siena, St John of God, St Margaret of Antioch, Saint Martín de Porres and Raphael the Archangel.

== See also ==
- Bishops and Bodies, a 2023 book about Catholic hospitals in the USA
- Catholic Health Association of the United States
- Catholic Medical Association
- Chinese medicine
- Islamic medicine
- Philosophy of healthcare
- Rose Mass
- White Mass
