= St. Joseph's Healthcare Hamilton =

Academic health science centre

- St. Joseph's Health System
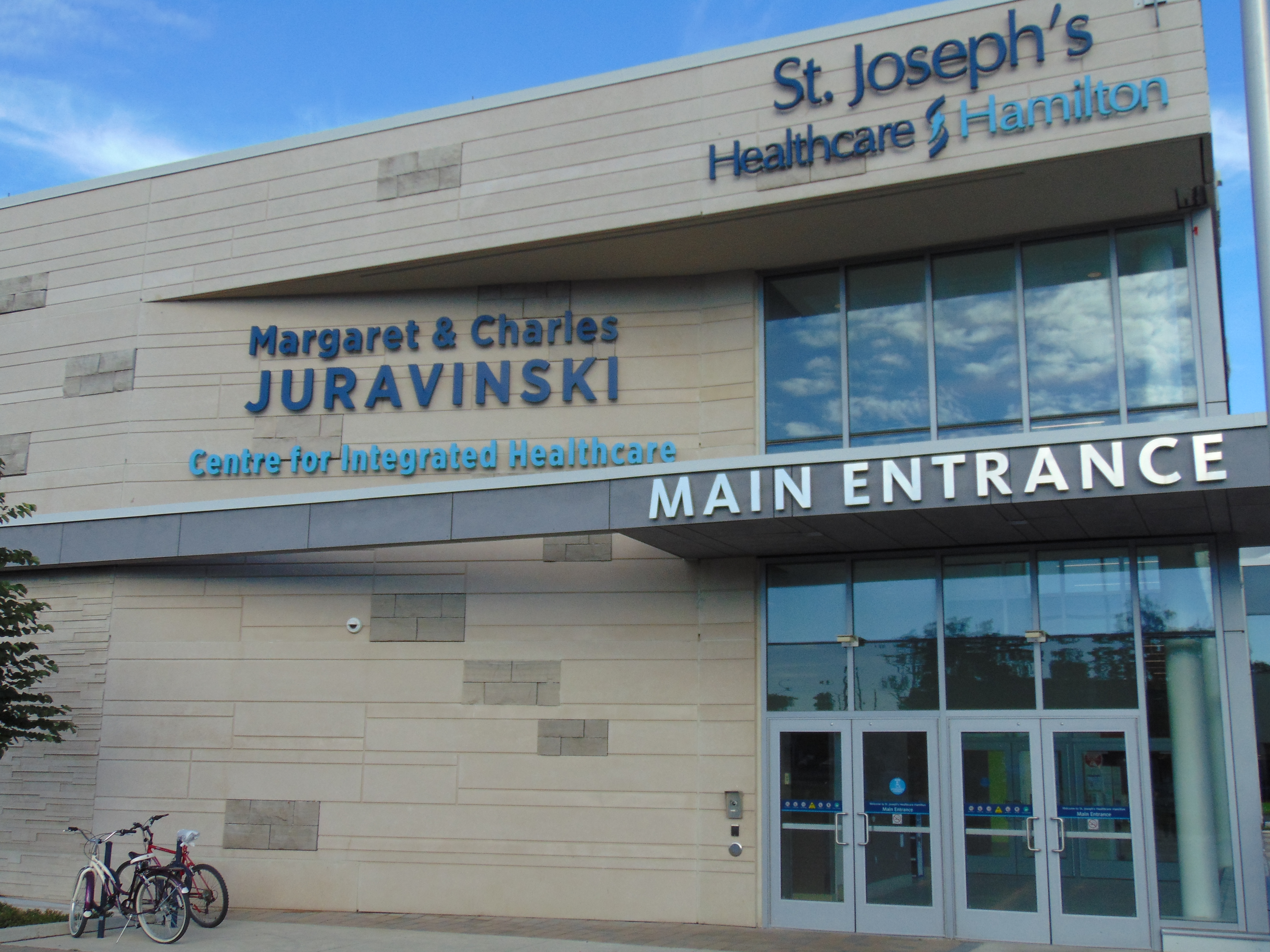
- Margaret and Charles Juravinski Centre in 2016

- Location in Ontario

Geography
- Location: Hamilton, Ontario, Canada
- Coordinates: 43.24894°N 79.87151°W

Organization
- Care system: Medicare (OHIP)
- Type: Specialized; teaching
- Affiliated university: McMaster University; McMaster School of Nursing; Michael G. DeGroote School of Medicine
- Network: St. Joseph's Health System

Services
- Emergency department: Yes
- Beds: 777

History
- Former name: St. Joseph's Hospital (1852–2000)
- Opened: 1852; 174 years ago

Links
- Website: www.stjoes.ca
- Lists: Hospitals in Canada

St. Joseph's Healthcare Hamilton is a 777-bed research hospital and academic health science centre located in Hamilton, Ontario, that is affiliated with the Michael G. DeGroote School of Medicine of McMaster University as well as Mohawk College. It is part of the St. Joseph's Health System and serves as the regional kidney transplant centre for a population of approximately 1.2 million people.

With three locations in Hamilton, the hospital is known for being one of the top national institutions for robotic surgery and for having one of the largest kidney and urinary programs. It's also first in Canada to partner a mental health worker with police to respond to a 911 crisis call.

Other services include acute care, surgical and outpatient services at three locations.

== Locations ==
=== Charlton Campus ===
St. Joseph's Healthcare's Charlton Campus is a busy, acute care centre that includes facilities such as the Firestone Institute for Respiratory Health, Centre for Minimal Access Surgery, and the Father Sean O'Sullivan Research Centre. This location has 600 beds.

=== West 5th Campus ===
St. Joseph's Healthcare Hamilton's West 5th Campus provides specialized tertiary mental health services for residents of Central South Region in Ontario, operating specialized mental health beds and providing leading-edge community services to thousands of outpatients.

The West 5th Campus recently underwent a major redevelopment. Construction began in January 2011 and the new building was completed in the summer of 2014. The new facility is approximately 800,000 square feet.

In 2019, the facility provided inpatient and outpatient care to those suffering with a severe mental illness or addiction, and more general medical outpatient clinics plus diagnostic imaging services. This campus is also known as the Margaret and Charles Juravinski Centre for Integrated Healthcare.

=== King Campus ===
St. Joseph's Healthcare Hamilton's King Campus is a stand-alone facility that has pioneered models of ambulatory care and includes a robust Surgery Centre for cataract surgeries and a satellite dialysis centre. The Regional Eye Institute (providing eye care and cataract surgery) is located here; the site is primarily for outpatient services, including pain management, a Mature Women's Health Centre, a 39-bed satellite Dialysis Clinic, and education programs.

== Programs ==
- Bariatric Surgery
- Cancer Care
- Chest
- Complex Care
- Critical Care / ICU
- Diabetes
- Diagnostic Imaging
- Emergency and Urgent Care
- Emergency Preparedness
- Family Medicine
- Gastroenterology
- General Internal Medicine
- Kidney Transplant Program
- Urologic surgery
- Laboratory Medicine
- Mental Health and Addictions Program
- Outpatient
- Orthopedics
- Rehabilitation
- Surgery
- Women and Infants Care
