= Maureen Markle-Reid =

Canadian nurse and professor

Academic background
- Education: M.Sc.N, University of Toronto; PhD, 2004, McMaster University
- Thesis: Frail elderly home care clients: the effects and expense of adding nursing health promotion and preventive care to personal support services (2004)

Academic work
- Institutions: McMaster School of Nursing

Maureen Francis Markle-Reid is a Canadian nurse. As a Full professor in the McMaster School of Nursing and Tier 2 Canada Research Chair, she oversaw numerous efforts to improve the quality of life for seniors moving from hospitals to home.

== Early life and education ==
Markle-Reid completed her Bachelor of Nursing degree at McMaster University while also working as a lifeguard and swimming instructor at the university pool. She then completed her Master of Science in Nursing at the University of Toronto and her PhD at McMaster University.

== Career ==
Following her Bachelor of Science in nursing, Markle-Reid worked as a staff nurse in Cardiac Care and Intensive Care at St. Joseph's Health Centre and Cardiac Care at Toronto Western Hospital. After completing her master's degree and PhD, she secured a five-year Ontario Career Scientist award. With her award, she led an initiative entitled "Interprofessional Stroke Rehabilitation For Stroke Survivors Using Home Care." Markle-Reid then transitioned into a career researcher role and became an assistant professor in McMaster School of Nursing in 2000. In 2013, she co-founded the Aging, Community and Health Research Unit (ACHRU) with Jenny Ploeg and served as its Co-Scientific Director. They received funding in 2014 to develop a web-based app called My Stroke Team (MyST) which will enable home care workers to share information. At the same time, Markle-Reid was appointed a Tier 2 Canada Research Chair to fund her research into chronic diseases in community living older adults and their family caregivers. In this role, she co-led a research study to design and test a six months hospital-to-home transitional care program for older patients with multiple chronic conditions and possibly symptoms of depression. In 2014, she became a Distinguished Fellow and adjunct professor at Mohawk College.

In 2017, Markle Reid's Canada Research Chair was renewed for another five years. Two years later, she co-founded the McMaster Collaborative for Health and Aging with Parminder Raina to address the needs of Ontario's older adults. In 2021, Markle Reid was inducted as a Canadian Academy of Health Sciences Fellow for her efforts into developing, implementing, evaluating and scaling-up integrated, patient-oriented interventions to improve care and outcomes for older adults with multimorbidity and their caregivers.

== Personal life ==
Markle-Reid and her husband David have two sons together.
