= Physica =

Physica may refer to:

- Physics (Aristotle)
- Physica, a twelfth-century medical text by Hildegard of Bingen
- Physica (journal), a Dutch scientific journal

- Physica A
- Physica B
- Physica C
- Physica D
- Physica E

- Physica Scripta, an international scientific journal for experimental and theoretical physics
