= St. Joseph's Health System =

Hospital network in Ontario, Canada

Geography
- Location: Hamilton, Guelph, Brantford, and Waterloo Region, Ontario, Canada

Organization
- Care system: Public Medicare (Canada) (OHIP)
- Type: General
- Affiliated university: McMaster University

Services
- Emergency department: Yes - at St. Joseph's Healthcare Hamilton

History
- Founded: 1991

Links
- Website: https://sjhs.ca/
- Lists: Hospitals in Canada

The St. Joseph's Health System is a Catholic hospital network in Ontario, Canada. Its locations include St. Joseph's Healthcare Hamilton, St. Joseph's Health Centre in Guelph, St. Joseph's Lifecare Centre in Brantford, St. Joseph's Villa in Dundas, St. Joseph's Home Care, and St. Mary's Health.

== History ==
The St. Josephs' Health System evolved from hospitals and other institutions created by the Sisters of St. Joseph's Hamilton branch such as St. Joseph's Healthcare Hamilton and the St. Joseph's Villa.

An external review concluded that 9 patients in the St. Joseph's Health System died by suicide in 2016 while being treated as patients or on a day pass. Two families of the deceased filed each filed a 8.5 million dollar negligence lawsuit against the St. Joseph's Health System in October 2017.

During the COVID-19 pandemic in Ontario, St. Joseph's Villa had a COVID-19 outbreak starting November 2020, resulting in at least 55 infections and 8 deaths.

Tom Stewart, the president and CEO of the St. Joseph's Health System, took an international holiday vacation to the Dominican Republic and other countries from December 18, 2020 until January 5, 2021, contrary to public health advice to avoid non-essential international travel. Upon his vacation being reported on by the press, Stewart apologized, said he regretted it, and stated that everyone should avoid non-essential travel. Union leaders representing Ontario Council of Hospital Unions/CUPE, the Registered Nurses' Association of Ontario, and SEIU Healthcare characterized Stewart's decision as "irresponsible" and poor leadership during a time that frontline health workers were struggling. On January 7, 2021, a day after Niagara Health System terminated its CEO-sharing agreement with St. Joseph's Health System, Stewart was removed as president and CEO by the board of directors.

St. Mary's General Hospital in Kitchener was previously a part of St. Joseph's Health System before its merger with Grand River Hospital to form the Waterloo Regional Health Network on April 1, 2025. SJHS supported the hospital merger and established a new entity, St. Mary's Health, on April 2, 2025 to provide home and community care in Waterloo Region.
