= Niagara Health System =

Hospital system in Ontario, Canada

Geography
- Location: Regional Municipality of Niagara, Ontario, Canada

Organization
- Care system: Public Medicare (Canada) (OHIP)
- Type: Public

Services
- Emergency department: Site Dependent
- Beds: Over 800

History
- Founded: 2000

Links
- Website: niagarahealth.on.ca
- Lists: Hospitals in Canada

The Niagara Health System, or Niagara Health (NH), is a Canadian multi-site hospital network, comprising five sites serving over 450,000 residents across the Regional Municipality of Niagara in Ontario. Niagara Health is one of Ontario's largest hospital systems, with 4,800 employees, 600 physicians and 850 volunteers. As of 2019, its annual operating budget was approximately $550 million.

== History ==
Niagara Health is the result of a government directive, in 1999, to amalgamate the five hospital sites serving the Regional Municipality of Niagara. At that time, the St. Catharines community was served by the Shaver Hospital, for chronic care, the Hotel Dieu Hospital, a Catholic acute care facility managed by the Religious Hospitallers of St. Joseph, and the St. Catharines General Hospital. With amalgamation, the Hotel Dieu was placed under the governance and management of Niagara Health and renamed the Ontario Street Site. Meanwhile, the Shaver was assumed by Hotel Dieu management and renamed Hotel Dieu Shaver Health and Rehabilitation Centre.

In 2013, Niagara Health opened the one-million-square-foot St. Catharines Site, replacing the St. Catharines General and Ontario Street sites. In 2018, the Town of Niagara-on-the-Lake assumed ownership of the Niagara-on-the-Lake Site. In 2024, 82% of the NHS's employees were women, which was higher than average for a Canadian healthcare system.

== Facilities ==
=== Current ===
- Niagara Falls Site (Greater Niagara General Hospital)
- St. Catharines Site (now Marotta Family Hospital)
- Welland Site

=== Future ===
- South Niagara Site (2028)

=== Planned for closure ===
- Fort Erie Site (2028)
- Port Colborne Site (2028)

== Controversies ==
Niagara was under an Ontario Nurses Association (ONA) censure from February 2003 until December 2010. According to an Ontario Nurses Association press release in June 2007, censuring is ONA's nationwide public reproach of a health agency due to the negative impact on staff and patient care, of poor labour relations and administrative practices.

In October 2008, the Niagara Health System Medical Staff Association passed a non-confidence vote in the NHS leadership by a vote of 136 to 76.

On May 17, 2010, the Ontario Health Coalition after conducting public hearings in March 2010 issued a report calling on the provincial government to send an investigator to the Niagara Health System, stating the following reasons:

Witnesses in Niagara described the poorest access to hospital beds and emergency department care of all the regions we visited. Cuts have been and are being implemented without any protections for resident access to care and without funding agreements, functional protocols and enablers in place. This panel observes that hospital care in Niagara is chaotic, perilously short-staffed and under-resourced. The hospital system has lost public confidence.

During the COVID-19 pandemic in Ontario, Tom Stewart, the CEO of Niagara Health, took an international holiday vacation to the Dominican Republic and other countries from December 18, 2020, until at least January 5, 2021, contrary to public health advice to avoid non-essential international travel. Upon his vacation being reported on by the press, Stewart apologized, said he regretted it, and that everyone should avoid non-essential travel. Union leaders representing Ontario Council of Hospital Unions/CUPE, the Registered Nurses' Association of Ontario, and SEIU Healthcare characterized Stewart's decision as "irresponsible" and poor leadership during a time that frontline health workers were struggling. On January 6, 2021, Niagara Health's board of directors voted to end its agreement with St. Joseph’s Health System to purchase Stewart's CEO services, replacing him on an interim basis with its president, Lynn Guerriero.
