= Margaret and Charles Juravinski Centre =

- St. Joseph's Healthcare Hamilton
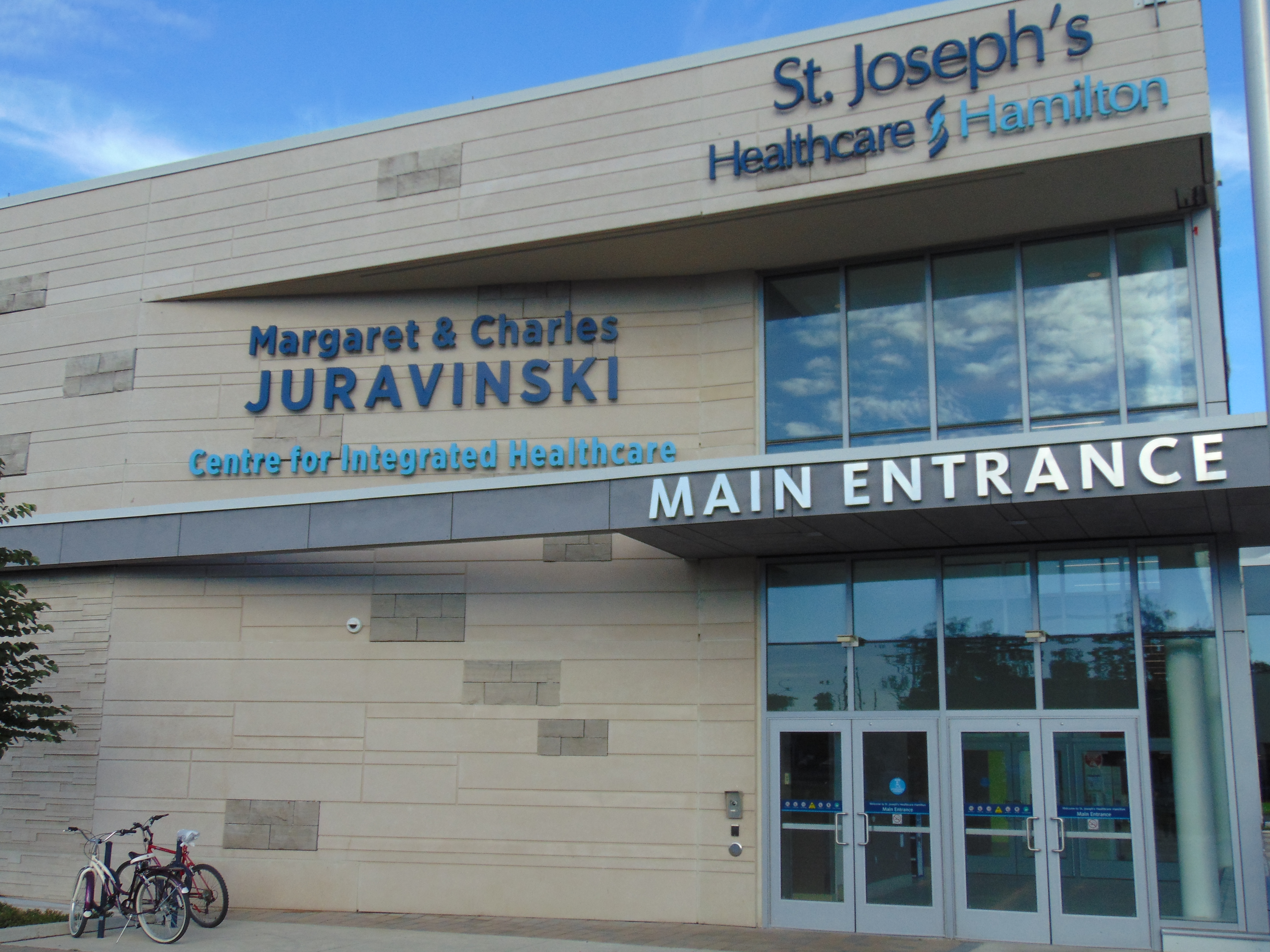
- Main entrance

Geography
- Location: Hamilton, Ontario, Canada
- Coordinates: 43.24038°N 79.88415°W

Organization
- Type: Specialist
- Affiliated university: McMaster University

Services
- Speciality: Psychiatric hospital

History
- Former name: Hamilton Hospital for the Insane
- Opened: 1876

Links
- Lists: Hospitals in Canada

The Margaret and Charles Juravinski Centre is a psychiatric hospital in Hamilton, Ontario. It serves the south-central Ontario, Canada population. It was originally established in 1876 as the Hamilton Hospital for the Insane, which was operated by the Ontario government until it was taken over by the St. Joseph's Healthcare Hamilton in 2000.

== History ==
Like many of the old psychiatric hospitals in Ontario, the Juravinski Centre replaced the ancient and obsolete Hamilton Psychiatric Hospital. Remnants of a patchwork of old buildings, tunnels and monuments are still in service and serve as remembrance to days gone by.

Originally called the Hamilton Hospital for the Insane, later renamed to the Ontario Hospital and finally the Hamilton Psychiatric Hospital before transfer of operations. The asylum began operation in 1876 with 202 patients, originally a population considered 'inebriated'.

The hospital was isolated but was mostly self-sufficient including a farm, bakery, greenhouse, butcher's shop, root cellar, tailor's shop, sewing room, fire hall, upholstery shop, power house, a bowling green, tennis courts and chapel along with a fleet of vehicles to transport the nearly 915 patients and 119 employees it housed by 1890.

At the turn of the century, the hospital commissioned a training school for psychiatric nursing and by 1956 had graduated over 240 nurses.

The Hamilton Psychiatric Hospital was owned and operated by the Ontario government for over 124 years. By November 2000, St. Joseph's Healthcare Hamilton gained control and has been operating as the Margaret and Charles Juravinski Centre under the auspices of St. Joseph’s Healthcare Hamilton. The new name was given to honor Charles Juravinski and his wife Margaret, who supported the hospital with their money and initially refused the renaming.

Programmes at this McMaster University Campus contribute to a reduction in disability and the stigma that often comes attached to diagnosis of mental illness or addiction.

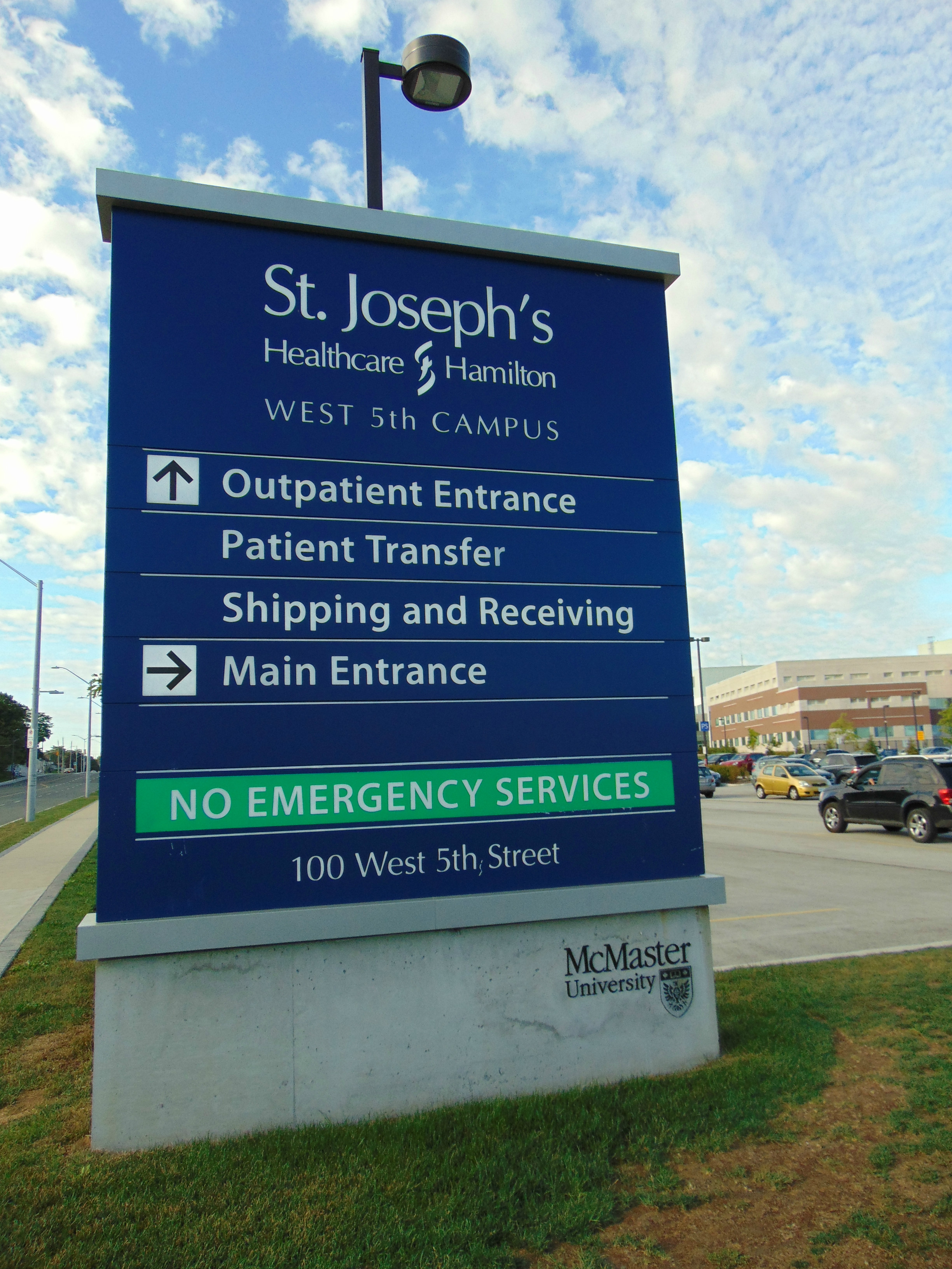
Entrance sign at the Margaret & Charles Juravinski Centre

West 5th (based on the street the hospital occupies), as it is colloquially known, concentrates on early intervention, outreach services, rehabilitation, recovery and integration into the community.

== Services ==
Included in the healthcare offered at Juravinski Centre are Concurrent Disorders Program; Men's Addiction Service Hamilton (MASH); Peter Boris Centre for Addictions Research; and the Womankind Addiction Service.

Mental health services available include:

- Acute Psychiatry
- Anxiety Treatment and Research Clinic (ATRC)
- Bridge To Recovery Program
- COAST
- Mobile Crisis Rapid Response Team (MCRRT)
- Community Psychiatry Clinic
- Consultation-Liaison Psychiatry Service
- Developmental Dual Diagnosis Program
- East Region Mental Health Services (ERMHS)
- Eating Disorders Program
- Emergency Psychiatry Services
- Forensic Psychiatry Program
- Mental Health and Wellness Resource Centre
- Mood Disorders Program
- Psychology Residency Program
- Clinical Practicum Placements
- Schizophrenia & Community Integration Service (SCIS)
- Seniors Mental Health Service
- Miss You Most Photography Exhibit
- Psychology Month
- Women's Health Concerns Clinic (WHCC)
- Youth Wellness Centre

== Other facilities ==
The centre includes a library dedicated to Pope Francis; a salon; fitness and physio recovery centres; museum; a thrift shop; a cafe and restaurant staffed by survivors of mental illness; a Tim Hortons and an auditorium and conference rooms for events.

Patients of the Margaret and Charles Juravinski Centre can attend Mohawk College nearby, with the assistance of vocational therapy.

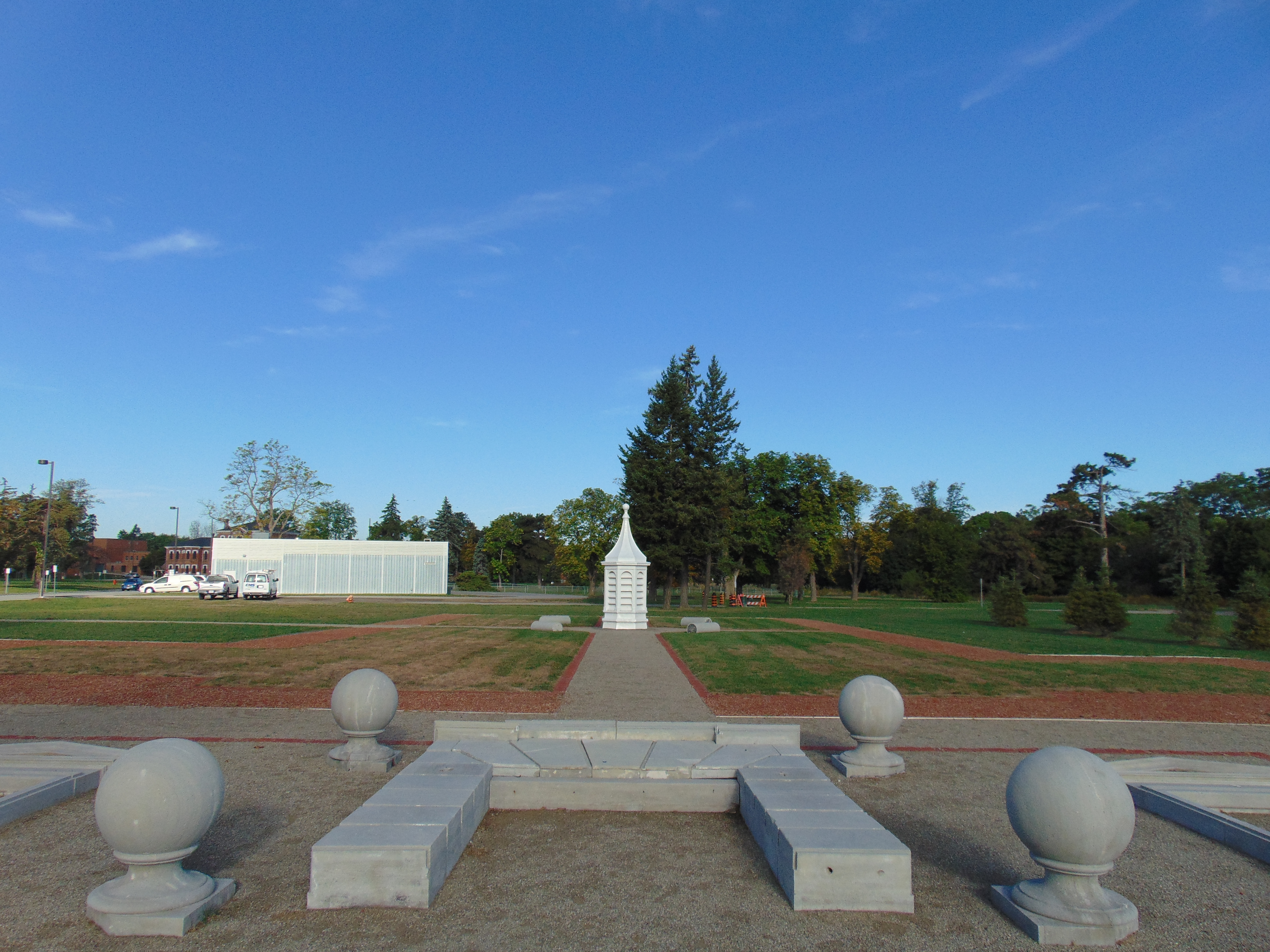
A memorial of the past history of Hamilton Psychiatric Hospital

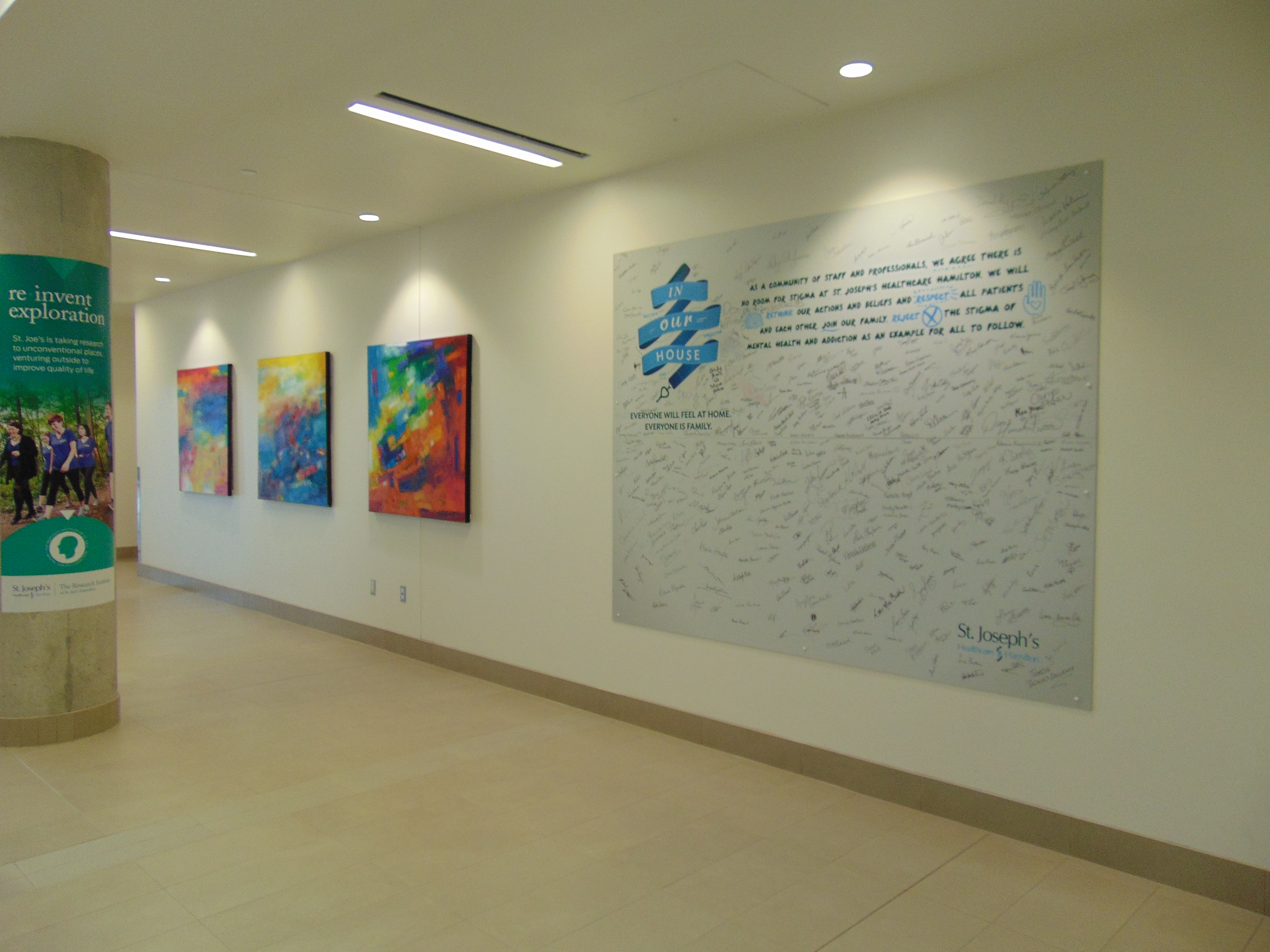
Artwork made by staff and patients at the Margaret & Charles Juravinski Centre

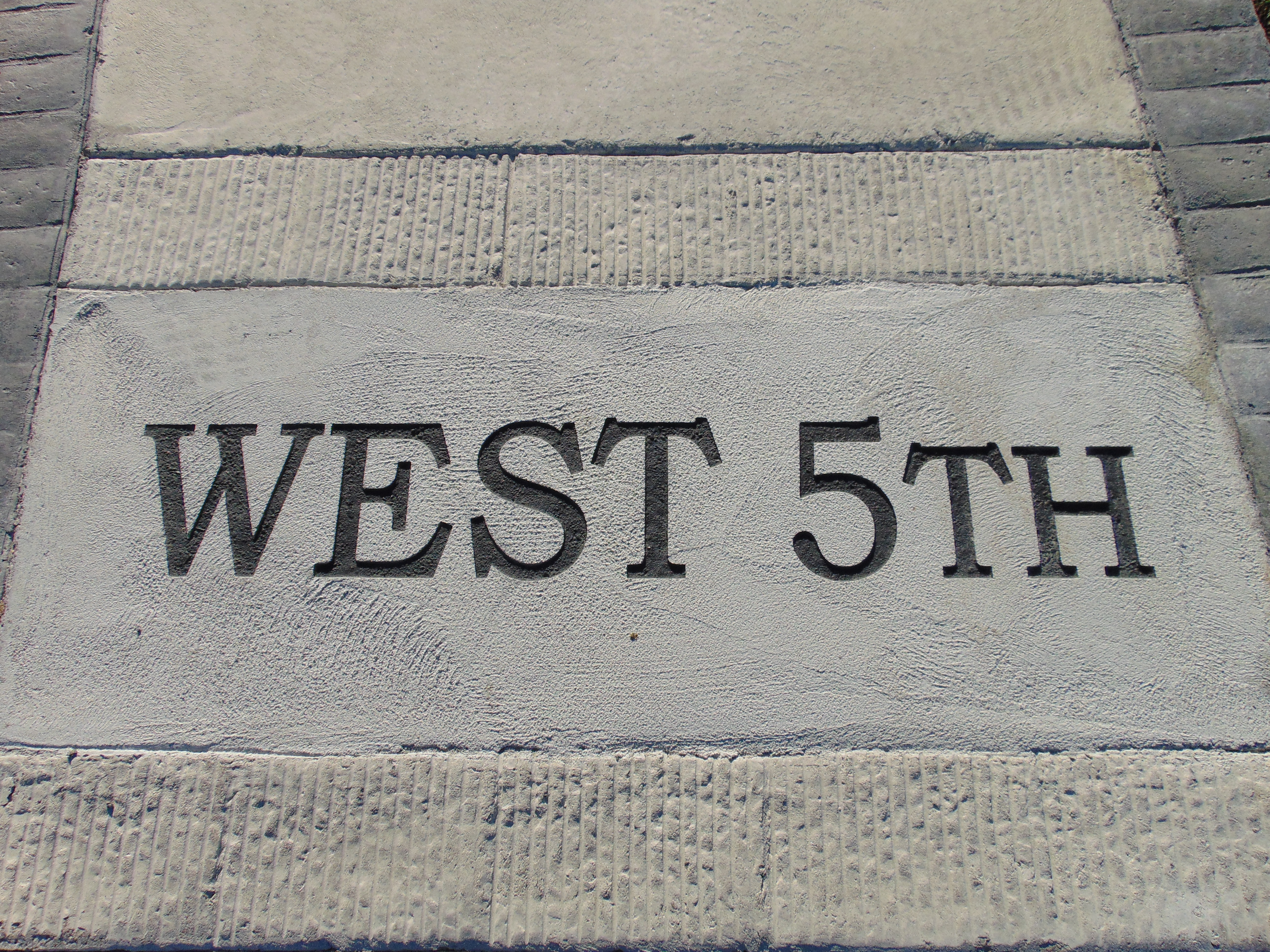
Concrete marker at the Margaret & Charles Juravinski Centre

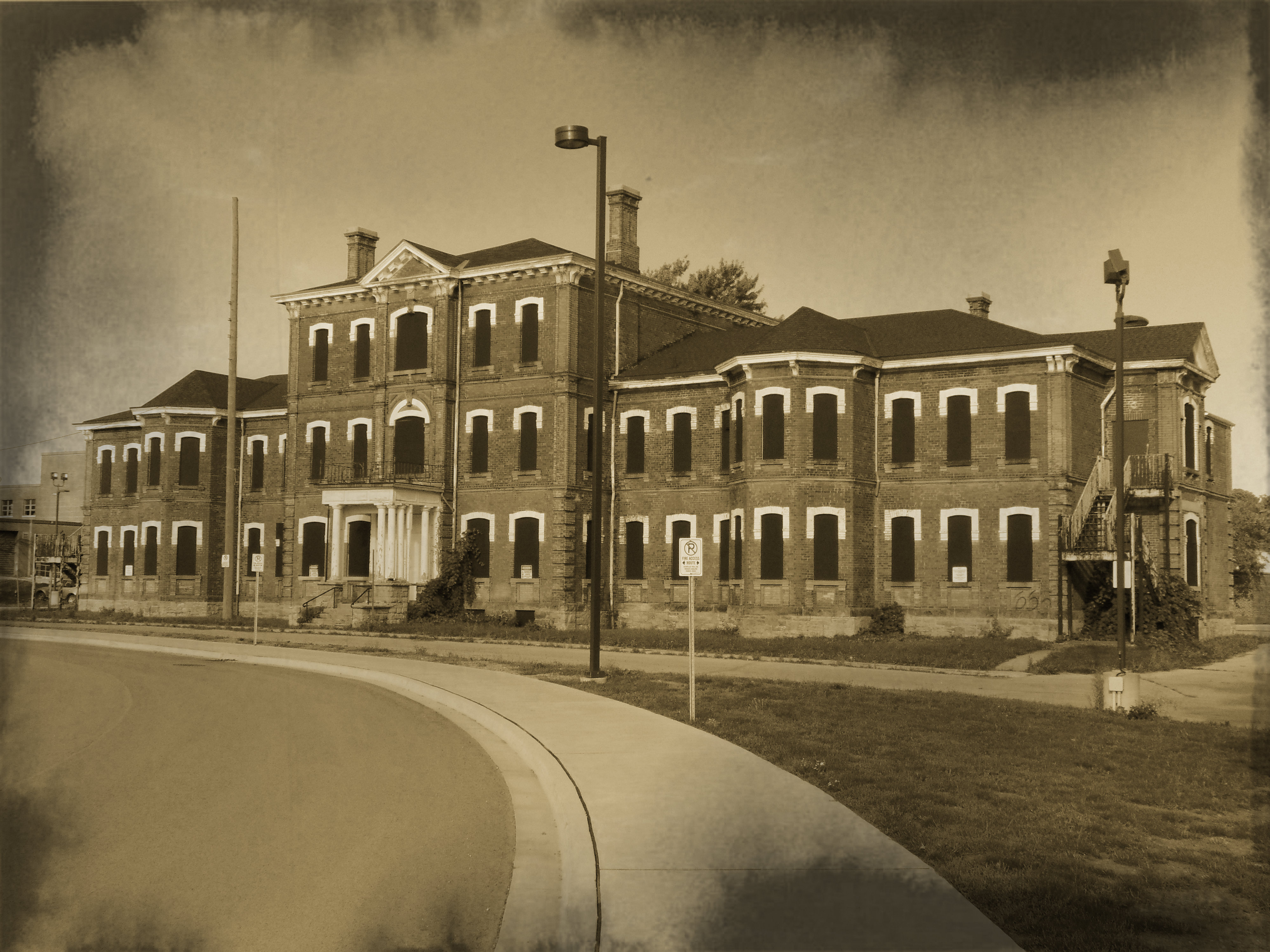
Admin building at obsolete Hamilton Psychiatric Hospital

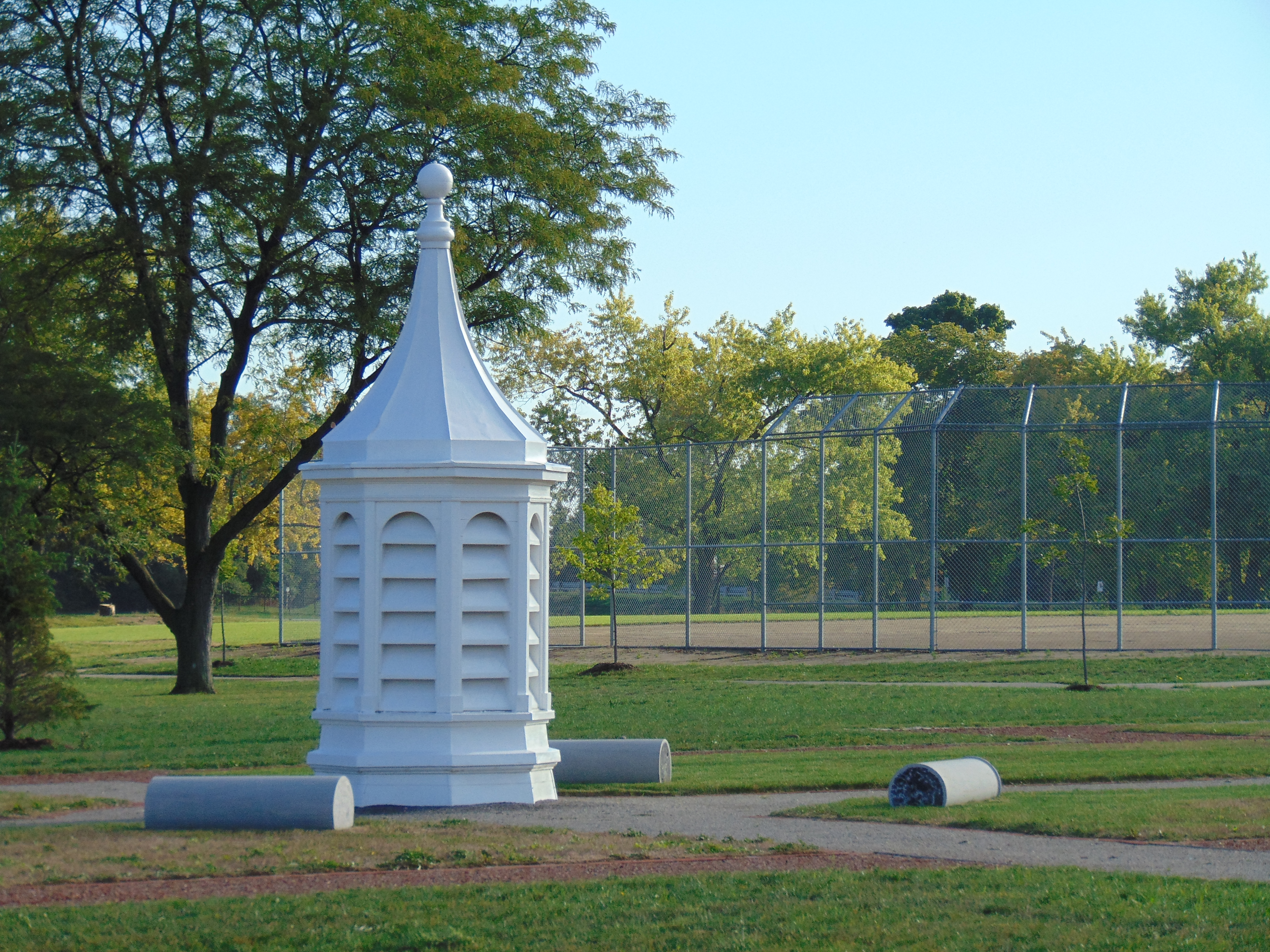
A memorial of the past history of Hamilton Psychiatric Hospital

== See also ==
- Bruce Trail
- Niagara Escarpment
- Auchmar house, one time home of Isaac Buchanan, business leader, political figure of Upper Canada
- Mohawk College
- St. Joseph's Healthcare Hamilton
