= Hamilton Insane Asylum =

Psychiatrist institution in Ontario

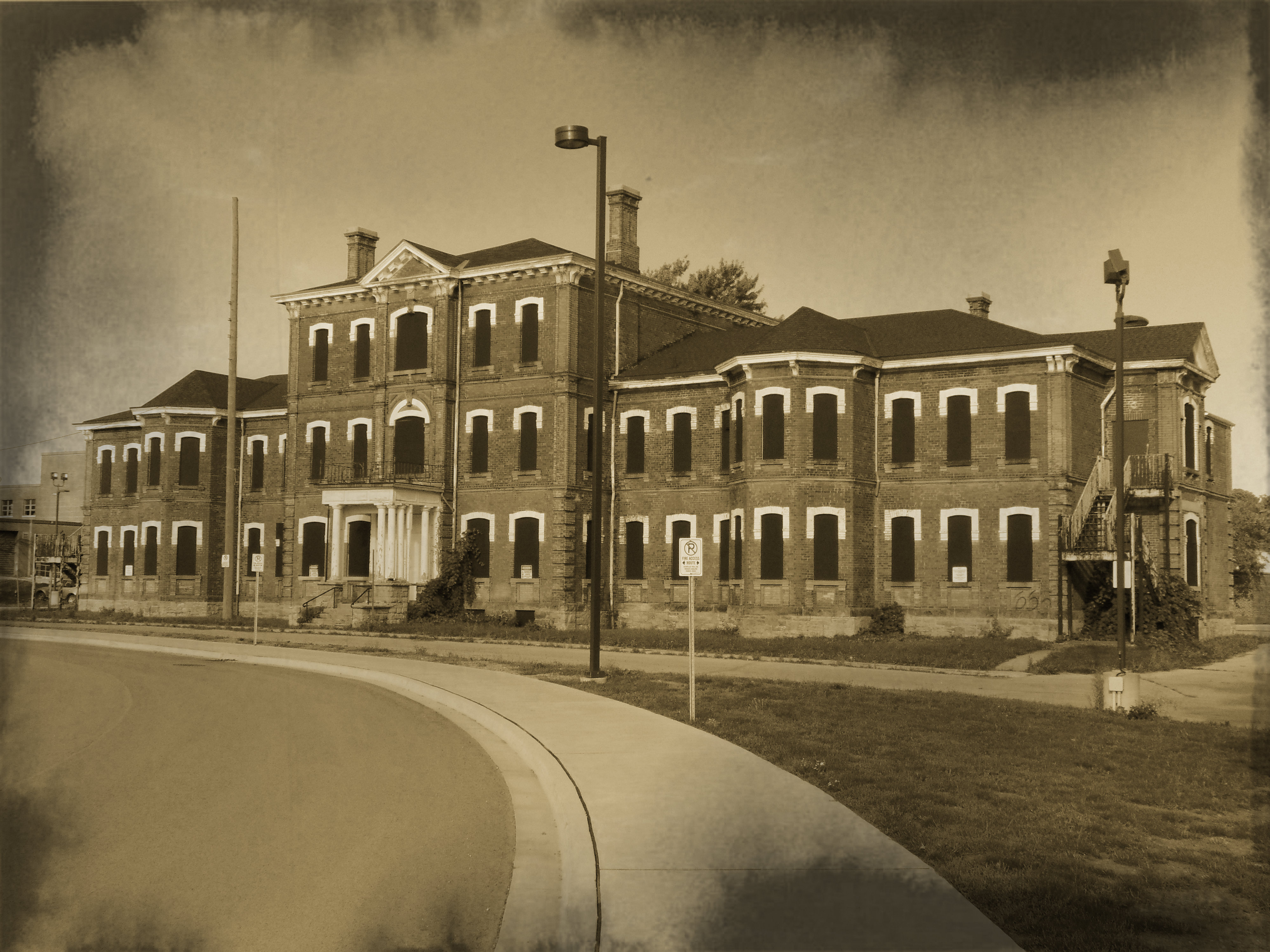
Admin building at obsolete Hamilton Asylum for the Insane

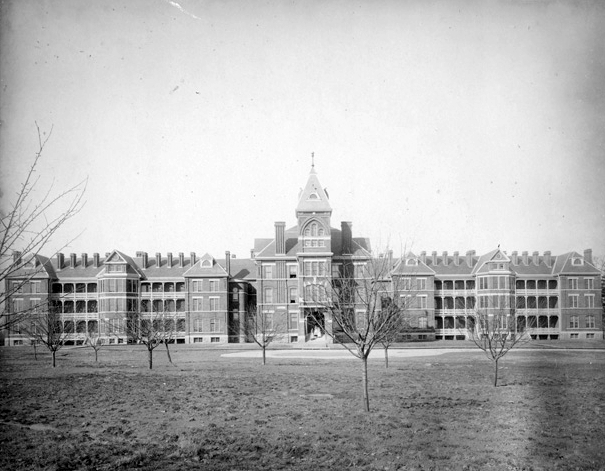
Orchard House, 1889

Hamilton Insane Asylum was a psychiatric hospital in Hamilton, Ontario. The asylum was opened in 1876 and moved some patients from the Toronto Asylum.

== Structures ==
Century Manor is a historic structure built in 1884 and the only remaining element of the asylum. The Victoria Gothic building on 500 acres property that remained in use until the 1980s. The other buildings were Orchard House and the Barton Building

Originally called East House, it served various roles:

- Home to treatment program for alcoholics
- Forensic psychiatry program
- School and treatment program for adolescents

It was briefly a museum, but it closed in 1995 and has since become vacant. All the other buildings relating to the asylum have been demolished and remains under provincial ownership.

== See also ==
- Margaret and Charles Juravinski Centre
