= Hotel Dieu Shaver =

Rehabilitation religious hospital in St. Catharines, Ontario, Canada

Hotel Dieu Shaver Health and Rehabilitation Centre

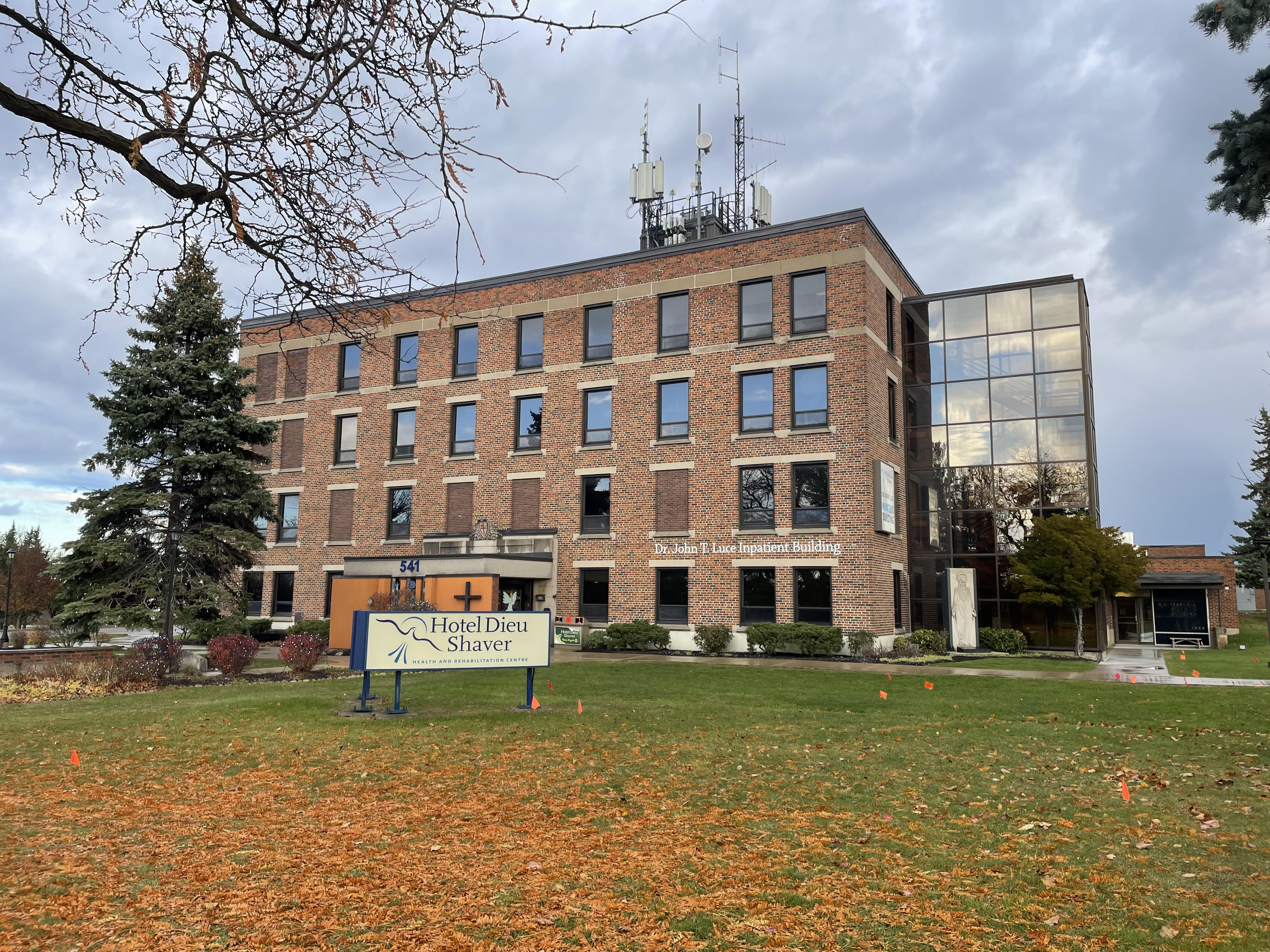
- Hotel Dieu Shaver seen from Glenridge Avenue in November 2025

Geography
- Location: St. Catharines, Niagara Region, Ontario, Canada
- Coordinates: 43.120783°N 79.243355°W

Organization
- Care system: Public
- Type: Rehabilitation hospital
- Religious affiliation: Catholic church

Services
- Beds: 134

History
- Founded: 1948

Links
- Website: www.hoteldieushaver.org
- Lists: Hospitals in Canada

Hotel Dieu Shaver Health and Rehabilitation Centre is Niagara's only specialty rehabilitation hospital, located in the south-end of St. Catharines, Ontario. Its mandate is to provide complex continuing care and rehabilitation services to patients in the city and Niagara Region.

Hotel Dieu Shaver is the result of hospital restructuring in St. Catharines which saw the Hotel Dieu Health Sciences Hospital (an acute care hospital in the city's downtown) assume governance and management of the Shaver Hospital and Niagara Peninsula Rehab Centre, which were formerly managed under Niagara Health. Niagara Health assumed responsibility of the facility once occupied by the Hotel Dieu, which became known as the Ontario Street Site of Niagara Health before closing, being replaced by the St. Catharines site in the city's west end. Hotel Dieu Shaver is a stand-alone legal entity, funded by the Ministry of Health. Hotel Dieu Shaver is not part of the Niagara Health System, although works closely with the acute hospital sites.

== History ==
Members of the Religious Hospitallers of St. Joseph arrived in St. Catharines, Ontario in 1945 to begin planning for a Hotel Dieu Hospital. After three years of planning, the original hospital was opened as a small maternity hospital on Ontario Street, in a large Victorian building known as the Woodruff Mansion.

Construction of a brand new Hotel Dieu Hospital began in 1950 and opened as a 125-bed healthcare facility on September 10, 1953. A new wing was later added in 1962, creating an additional 54,000 square feet (5,000 m^{2}) of space for the growing hospital.

In 1975, Niagara Region's first and only dialysis unit opened at Hotel Dieu, leading to the opening of a regional diabetes centre in 1987, and the L.B. Herzog Dialysis Centre in 1994.

On August 8, 2005, Hotel Dieu assumed governance and management of Shaver Hospital and Niagara Peninsula Rehab Centre in the city's south-end. The Hotel Dieu hospital was taken over by the Niagara Health System and opened later that year as the Ontario Street Site of the NHS, providing minor acute care. When Niagara Health opened a new hospital in the city's west end, this replaced both the Ontario Street Site and the St. Catharines General site.

== See also ==
- Hôtel-Dieu de Montréal
