= Bishops and Bodies =

2023 book by Lori Freedman

Bishops and Bodies: Reproductive Care in American Catholic Hospitals
- First edition cover of the 2023 Rutgers University Press edition
- Authors: Lori Freedman
- Language: English
- Subjects: Sociology
- Publisher: Rutgers University Press
- Publication date: 2023
- Publication place: USA
- Media type: Print (hardcover, paperback)
- Pages: 228
- Awards: Donald W. Light Award (2024)
- ISBN: 9781978828865

Bishops and Bodies: Reproductive Care in American Catholic Hospitals is a 2023 book by sociologist Lori Freedman, published by Rutgers University Press. The book is an interview-based study of reproductive care in hospitals following the policies of the US Conference of Catholic Bishops. The book examines the impact of the conference's directives and their implications for medical practice. The book received the American Sociological Association's Section on Medical Sociology Donald W. Light Award for Applied or Public Practice of Medical Sociology in 2024.

== Description ==
The US Conference of Catholic Bishops governs Catholic hospitals and directs the Ethical and Religious Directives for Catholic Health Care Services. Approximately one in six patients treated in the United States is treated at a Catholic hospital, however many patients are unaware of how this shapes their health care. Through interviews with practitioners and patients, Freedman explores how the decisions made by Catholic bishops shape reproductive health care. Freedman introduces the term "doctrinal iatrogenesis" to conceptualize how religious policies come to limit medical treatment and negatively impact patients.

== Reception ==
In a review for the Journal of Church and State, Linda Abarbanell wrote that on the matter of Catholic policies in hospitals "Lori Freedman illustrates the harms of such policies and offers a grim warning for US healthcare". Abarbanell said that Freedman's "interviews illustrate how practitioners may withhold information about procedures or treatments that are unavailable due to religious restrictions, even when those options are considered medical best practices".

Paul J. Wojda, writing in the Journal of Moral Theology, said that Freedman's criticism of Catholic hospitals in the book is "what amounts to a legal brief against what she sees as their increasingly worrisome hegemony over health care". In his review, Wojda wrote that "Freedman is a gifted writer: these narratives are superbly written, as is the book overal". Wojda commented that readers "will be frustrated by Freedman’s failure to ask whether and to what degree the substandard care she describes is the result of a provider’s misreading and consequent misapplication of the ERDs".

Reviewing the book in Conscience Magazine, published by Catholics for Choice, Elizabeth Reiner Platt said that "Freedman argues persuasively" for the concept of doctrinal iatrogenesis. Platt commented that "Perhaps the most significant question Freeman raises is how do we both recognize abortion as necessary healthcare for everyone and avoid pernicious narratives of “worthy” and “unworthy” abortions, while also acknowledging the specific horror of being turned away during a medical emergency".

=== Awards ===
- ASA Section on Medical Sociology Donald W. Light Award for Applied or Public Practice of Medical Sociology in 2024.
