= Physica (Hildegard) =

12th-century text by Hildegard of Bingen

The Physica (Medicine), also known as the Liber simplicis medicine (Book of Simple Medicine), is a 12th-century medical text by Hildegard of Bingen.

== Publication history ==
Hildegard of Bingen served as an infirmarian at her first monastery and was well-acquainted with various medical traditions. What was subsequently given the conventional title of Physica, or Medicine, by Johannes Schott is part of Hildegard's lost medical collection, the Subtilitatum diversarum naturarum creaturarum libri novem (Nine Books on the Subtleties of Different Kinds of Creatures), written between 1151 and 1158.

In 1222, Gebeno, prior of the Cistercian monastery at Eberbach, claimed in the foreword of his Speculum futurorum temporum (Mirror of Future Times; a compilation of prophecies by Hildegard) that she had written a "book of simple medicine" (librum simplicis medicine). A decade later, the Physica (under the title of Liber simplicis medicine) was submitted to Rome as part of Hildegard's canonisation inquiry, alongside the Liber composite medicine (Book of Compound Medicine), (Note: This text is now conventionally referred to as Cause et cure (Causes and Cures).) another entry in Hildegard's Subtilitatum.

The Physica survives in at least nine manuscripts dating from as early as the thirteenth century, five of which contain the full text.

== Content ==
The Physica comprises nine books on plants (230 chapters), elements (63 chapters), (Note: Namely various types of air, "water" (rivers), and "earth" (such as calamine and clay).) trees (63 chapters), stones (26 chapters), fish (37 chapters), birds (72 chapters), (Note: Possibly including certain unidentified flying insects.) animals (45 chapters), (Note: Namely various quadrupeds.) reptiles (18 chapters), and metals (8 chapters). Each chapter discusses the medicinal properties of an entity based on the ideas of hot, cold, wet, and dry.

== Legacy ==
According to Lois N. Magner, the Physica was "probably the first book by a female author to discuss the elements and the therapeutic virtues of plants, animals, and metals", as well as the first book on natural history composed in Germany.
