= McMaster School of Nursing =

Nursing school in Ontario, Canada

- Established: 1946
- Dean: Dr. Carolyn Byrne
- Location: Hamilton, ON, Canada
- Website: McMaster School of Nursing

The McMaster School of Nursing (SON) was established in 1946.

== History ==
In 1942, McMaster began its first nursing programme, co-developed by the university and the Hamilton General Hospital. Graduates received a Bachelor of Arts degree B.A. along with a diploma in nursing from the Hospital upon completion. These qualifications enabled students to write the examination for nurse registration. In 1967, the SON adopted the self-directed, problem-based, student-centered learning methodology. In 1974, the SON became part of the Faculty of Health Sciences.

== Today ==
In 1992, the SON was designated a World Health Organization Collaborating Centre in Primary Care and Teaching methodologies. The terms of reference for the centre are to provide information and expert support in the development of innovative teaching strategies.

The Post Diploma stream of the B.Sc.N. programme was created in response to the unique educational needs of the diploma graduate. The educational philosophy and the McMaster Model of Nursing were incorporated into professional and distance education. Two years later, graduate studies in Clinical Health Sciences (Nursing) were launched.
