= University of Ottawa Faculty of Medicine =

Coordinates: 45.4012°N 75.6468°W

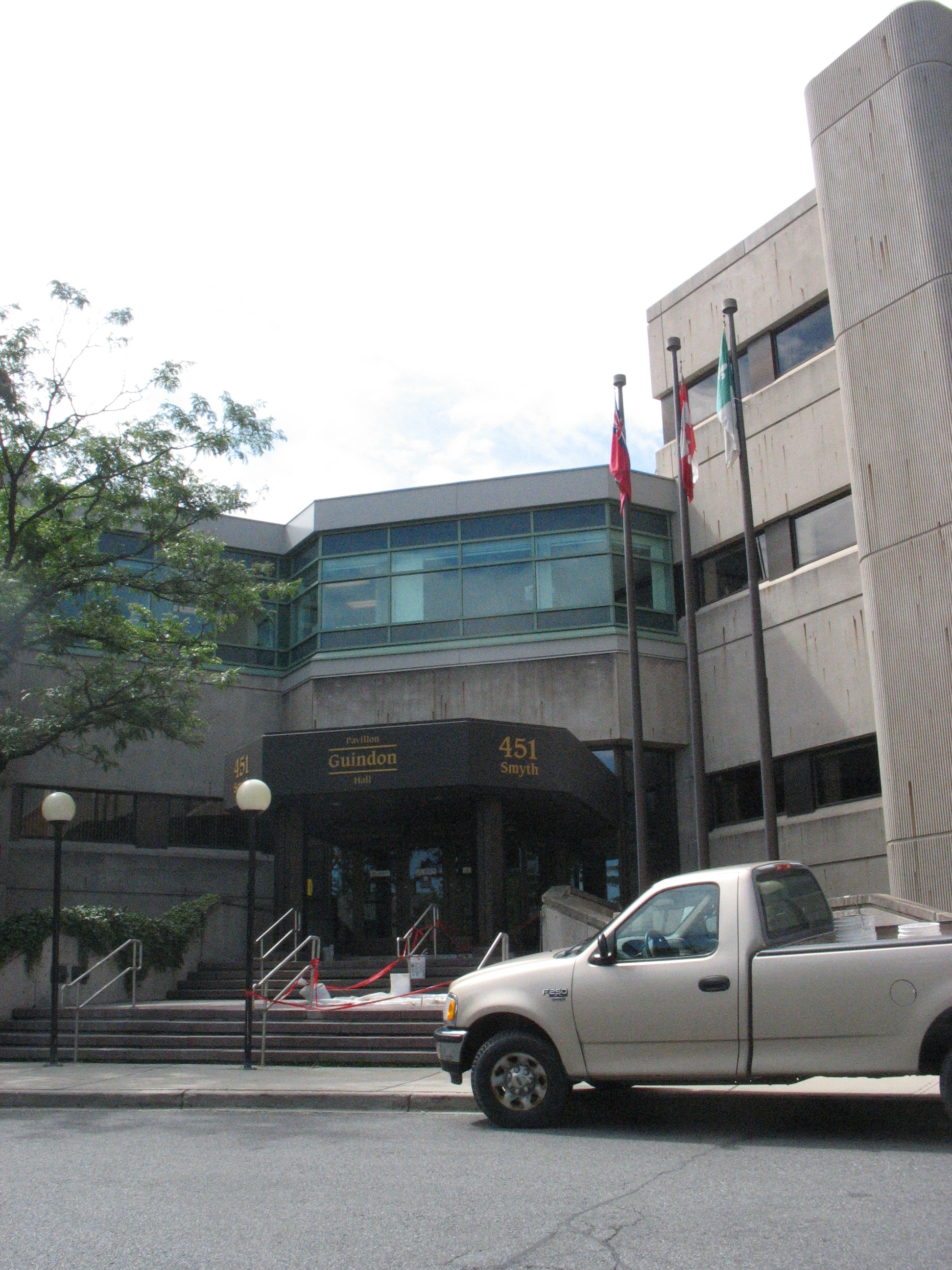
Entrance at 451 Smyth Rd. (Roger-Guindon Hall)

The Faculty of Medicine (French: Faculté de médecine) at the University of Ottawa is a bilingual medical school in Ottawa, Ontario, Canada founded in 1945. It is located at a campus centred on Roger-Guindon Hall in the east end of Ottawa and is attached to the Ottawa Hospital's General Campus. The Health Sciences Complex is separate from the downtown University of Ottawa campus.

== Undergraduate program ==
The current undergraduate MD program at the University of Ottawa is a 4-year program accepting about 160 students per year; 44 in the French stream and 116 in the English stream. All courses are offered in both languages and students can attend any course they choose. Exams are written in either language. The undergraduate MD curriculum has recently undergone major changes. The first year for the new curriculum was the 2008-2009 school year. Major changes include a more global teaching system with 1 cumulative exam per semester, the restrictions of classes to the hours between 8 am and noon to allow students to complete more elective experiences as well as the institution of Self-Learning Modules (SLM) which the student complete on their own time outside of class.

The undergraduate medical society is known as the Aesculapian Society.

In 2015-16, the medical program introduced the Casper test, developed by McMaster University Medical School, as part of their admissions process.

== Research and graduate programs ==
The Department of Cellular & Molecular Medicine (CMM) is a large dynamic interdisciplinary department consisting of 30 faculty researchers and teaching staff, as well as 63 cross-appointed or adjunct members. It offers graduate programs at the M.Sc and Ph.D. level, as well as post-doctoral training. The department maintains an active and well-funded multi-disciplinary research program for the study of normal and pathological cell function in a variety of physiological systems. Specific faculty research interests include computational biology, cancer, cardiovascular regulation, growth and development, the gastrointestinal system, renal function, obesity and diabetes, pharmacology and neuroscience. CMM was formed from the combined resources of three former departments of the University of Ottawa: Physiology, Pharmacology and Anatomy & Neurobiology. CMM is part of the Ottawa Health Sciences Centre, a medical complex which also includes the Ottawa Hospital (General Campus), Children's Hospital of Eastern Ontario (CHEO), the Ottawa Regional Cancer Centre, (OHRI) Ottawa Health Research Institute (General Campus), the Children's Hospital of Eastern Ontario Research Institute.

== Teaching hospitals and research affiliations ==
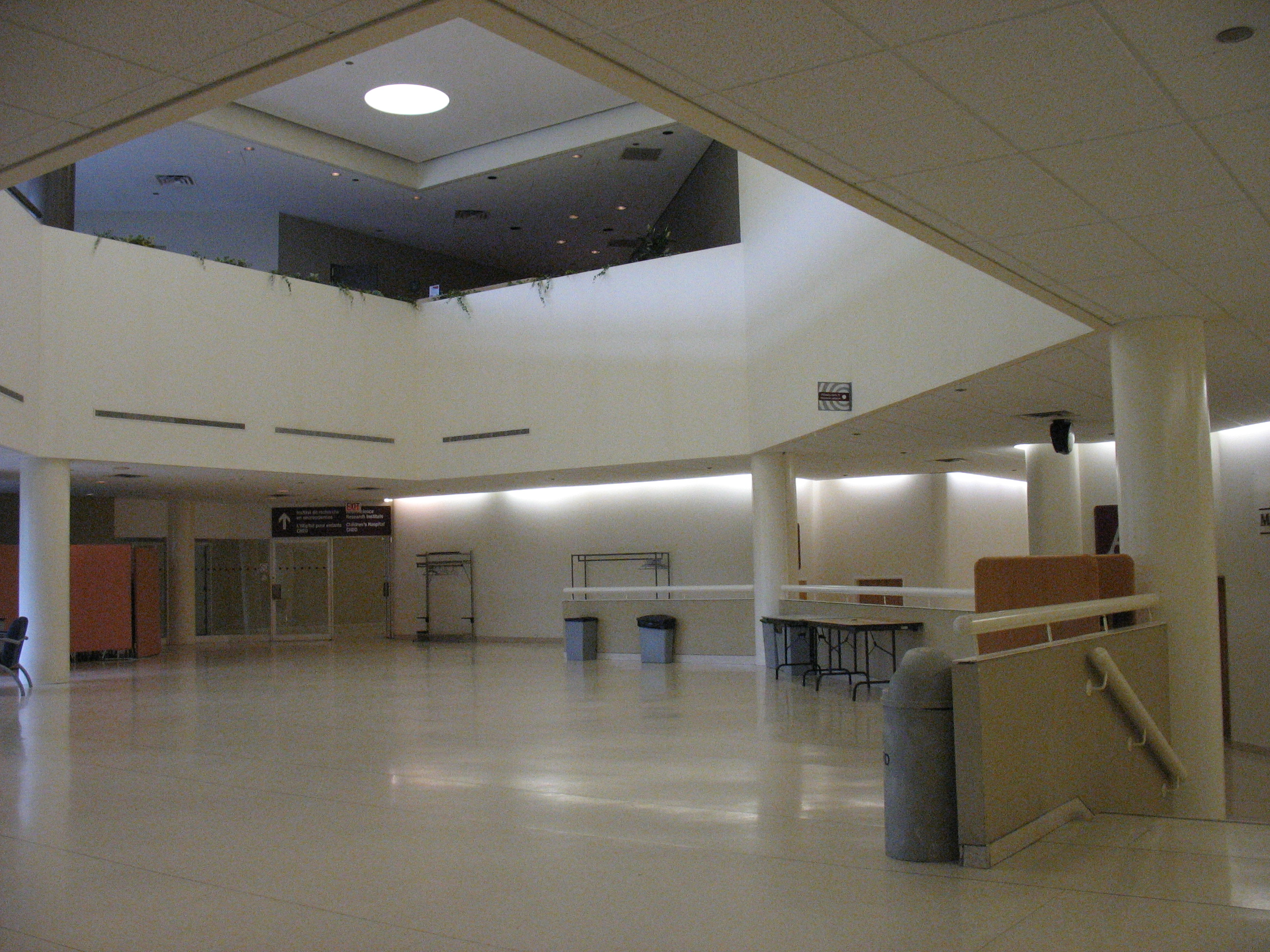
Roger-Guindon Hall

The medical school is associated with the following teaching hospitals:

- The Ottawa Hospital, with Civic, General and Riverside campuses
- The Children's Hospital of Eastern Ontario (CHEO)
- Montfort Hospital
- Bruyère Continuing Care

The Faculty is affiliated with several research institutions including:

- The Ottawa Hospital Research Institute
- The Royal Ottawa Health Care Group
- University of Ottawa Heart Institute
- University of Ottawa Eye Institute
- University of Ottawa Institute of Palliative Care
- University of Ottawa Institute of Mental Health Research
- University of Ottawa Neuroscience Research Institute

During the COVID-19 pandemic, the faculty received a $375,000 grant from the Public Health Agency of Canada's Immunization Partnership Fund to promote COVID-19 vaccines to minority Francophone Canadians.

== Notable alumni ==
- Philip Steven Wells MD 1984, clinical hematologist responsible for the internationally renowned Wells' Criteria for Deep Vein Thrombosis and Pulmonary Embolism, through which many emergency departments stratify possibility of DVT and PE.
- Wilbert Keon MD 1961, OC OOnt, renowned heart surgeon, first in Canada to transplant artificial heart, founder of the University of Ottawa Heart Institute
- Dafydd Williams OC OOnt, Canadian Space Agency astronaut
- Robert Elgie, politician and neurosurgeon
- Kieran Moore, Chief Medical Officer of Health of Ontario

== Notable faculty ==
- Yoni Freedhoff, family physician, founder and medical director of the Bariatric Medical Institute
