= Alton Sutnick =

American medical researcher and educator (1928–2026)

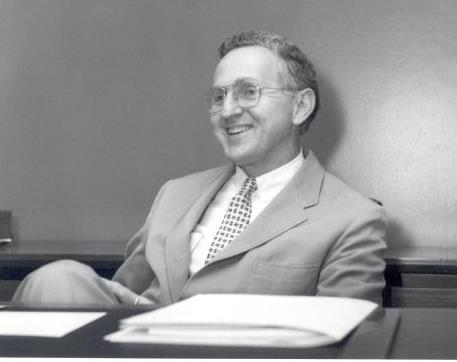
Sutnick in 1977

Alton Ivan Sutnick (July 6, 1928 – March 20, 2026) was an American medical researcher, educator and administrator. He was the author of over 200 scholarly publications.

== Education ==
In 1950, Alton Sutnick received his bachelor's degree in chemistry from the University of Pennsylvania and in 1954, he received his medical degree from the University of Pennsylvania School of Medicine.

== Medical researcher ==
In 1961, Sutnick established a laboratory for the study of pulmonary surfactant at Temple University School of Medicine. He was the first medical researcher to apply pulmonary surfactant physiological observations to adult human lung disease, including pneumonia, lung cancer and pulmonary embolism, which are all associated with atelectasis.

Between 1958 and 1965, Sutnick conducted research on new drug and surgical treatments for hypertension while he was a fellow at the University of Pennsylvania School of Medicine, chief of medicine of the U.S. Army Hospital in Paris, and a faculty member at the Temple University School of Medicine. As chief of medicine at the army hospital, Sutnick observed and evaluated the first human bone marrow transplants, administered by Georges Mathé to six Yugoslav physicists who had been inadvertently exposed to lethal doses of radiation in 1959. Sutnick later served as a member of the National Heart, Lung and Blood Institute's National High Blood Pressure Education Working Group.

In 1965, Sutnick joined Dr. Baruch Blumberg at The Institute for Cancer Research. Dr. Blumberg had discovered what appeared to be a persistent trait in the blood of some populations which he called "Australia antigen". Sutnick found that it was acquired and associated with inflammatory disease of the liver, drawing “the first formal connection between the mysterious antigen and hepatitis” recognizing that the antigen was likely part of a hepatitis virus. Subsequent studies confirmed that it was indeed Hepatitis B virus, so Sutnick’s observation led directly to the prevention of transfusion hepatitis, the hepatitis B vaccine, and the award of the Nobel Prize to Dr. Blumberg. In 1972, Sutnick was one of the first to describe an entity that became known as hepatitis C.

The recognition of Hepatitis B antigen occurred in patients with Down’s Syndrome, so they became a related subject of investigation, particularly as a model for leukemia susceptibility. Sutnick was the first to recognize the relationship of iron stores to cancer susceptibility, and reduced life expectancy. This happened at the time when the American Oncologic Hospital became part of the Fox Chase Cancer Center. Sutnick, already Associate Director of the Institute, was appointed Director of Clinical Development for the hospital, and brought on the first full-time academic clinicians.

His susceptibility studies led him to collaborate with Dr. Daniel Miller to create Canscreen, the first cancer screening program based on risk factor analysis. Canscreen included not only detection, but also cancer prevention and health education, and research in cancer risk factors. In 1972, he expanded Canscreen to become the cancer control and prevention program at Fox Chase and was asked to serve on the working group at the National Cancer Institute in planning the establishment of its National Cancer Control Program.

Sutnick was subsequently invited by the World Health Organization to help India and Indonesia develop cancer programs as well. He worked together with Soviet scientist Dr. Yuri Puchkov on the India project, the first time a Soviet-American team had addressed a health problem in another country. The American Journal of Public Health recognized it as an important step of cooperation between the two rival super-powers.

== Medical educator ==
In 1975, Sutnick was named Dean and Professor of Medicine at The Medical College of Pennsylvania (now Drexel University College of Medicine). In 1989, he was appointed Vice President and Chief Operating Officer at the Educational Commission for Foreign Medical Graduates. Sutnick introduced a family medicine program in Moldova after the fall of the Soviet Union and also developed international programs in the United States, Israel, Spain, Ukraine and Brazil.

As an educator, Sutnick was a pioneer in assessing the clinical skills of medical students and residents. In the 1960s, Howard Barrows and Paula Stillman introduced the use of simulated patients so that the clinical skills of all students in a medical school class could be tested in a standardized examination. In 1989, Sutnick, collaborating with Stillman and John Norcini adapted this method so that actors in different centers could be trained to simulate the same symptoms and physical findings. This allowed the testing of large numbers of medical students and residents from around the world for U.S. certification and licensure examination purposes in multiple U.S. testing centers. They also established the validity of this clinical skills assessment by showing that the scores of students on simulated patients correlated with the subsequent ratings given by their supervisors in hospitals.

He was the first to use simulated patients to demonstrate colloquial English and test the spoken English skills of graduates of foreign medical schools. He introduced clinical skills examinations using simulated patients in Israel, Spain, Brazil, Russia and Ukraine, demonstrating that the examination results could be compared on the same scale across countries, languages and cultures.

As the vice president of American Associates of Ben-Gurion University of the Negev, Sutnick developed partnerships for Ben Gurion with Fox Chase Cancer Center and Drexel University.

Sutnick's international work has extended to over 50 nations throughout Latin America, Europe, Asia, Africa, and the Middle East. He has worked with numerous governments and universities to help them update their medical educational programs and institute higher standards of medical education and practice. For example, he helped India develop a cancer control program, worked with Indonesian officials to establish a cancer registry, and strengthened family medicine education in China, Moldova, Lithuania and Ukraine. These programs have improved health care services for millions of people.

== Death ==
Al Sutnick died peacefully on the morning of March 20, 2026, at the age of 97.

== Awards ==
Sutnick received the following honors and awards, among others: the Torch of Learning Award from the American Friends of the Hebrew University; the Philadelphia County Medical Society’s Strittmater Gold Medal; and the American Medical Association’s Dr. William Beaumont Award in Medicine.
