= John Kelton =

John Kelton may refer to:

- John G. Kelton, Canadian hematologist
- John C. Kelton (1828–1893), United States Army general
- John Kelton (footballer) (1937–2012), Australian rules footballer
