= Richard Whitlock =

Richard Whitlock may refer to:

- Richard Whitlock (writer) (1616-1666), English doctor, vicar, and the author of Zootomia.
- Richard Whitlock (surgeon), Canadian cardiovascular surgeon.
