= Basic sciences examination =

The Basic Sciences Examination is run by the Royal Australasian College of Surgeons for surgical trainees in the Surgical Education and Training Program. It is conducted in February and June of every year for all surgical candidates and is composed of written and clinical formats. Only candidates in a surgical training program in Australia or New Zealand can participate in the examinations.

The written format consists of Generic and Specialty-Specific examinations. In total, there are 3 written examinations, each running for 2.5 hours. The clinical component is in an Objective Structured Clinical Examination composed of 16 stations, which usually runs for 2 hours.

== Generic exam ==
The Generic exam comprises two written papers, each with 120 questions. There are three formats of questions: relationship type, choose one best answer and true/false type questions.

All candidates are expected to sit the Generic exam in their first year of training. If this exam is not passed, further advancement in training cannot be gained. The examination is run at multiple centers across Australia and New Zealand.

The disciplines covered in this exam include: anatomy, physiology, clinical scenarios, pathology (including genetics), histopathology, cellular biology, immunology, pharmacology and statistics. The latter three disciplines are combined into pathology when determining the pass mark for each discipline.

== Specialty-specific exam ==
All candidates must sit their own specialty-specific exam with questions aimed at their discipline. There are also general questions relevant to all specialties. General Surgery and Urology candidates sit a combined specialty paper. All other specialties have their separate papers.

All specialty-specific exams have 120 questions and the same format as the Generic Exam. The pass mark is determined using multiple statistical analyses and the performance analysis of "marker" questions.

== Objective structured clinical examination ==
All candidates must participate in this examination, which has 16 stations and four core components: History taking, Examination performance, Procedural competence, and Counseling/Obtaining consent.

Each core component has 4 stations. Each station runs for 5 minutes, with 1 minute of reading time prior. Candidates are expected to provide a running commentary while performing procedures and/or examinations. The marking scheme is specially designed for each station.
