= Dawn Bowdish =

Canadian immunologist

Dawn M. E. Bowdish
- Born: May 21, 1976 (age 50); Hamilton, Canada
- Education: University of British Columbia, Vancouver; University of Oxford, England
- Scientific career
- Fields: Biology; Immunology; Aging
- Workplaces: McMaster University
- Academic advisors: Lori Burrows; Joe Lam; Robert E. W. Hancock; Siamon Gordon

Dawn M. E. Bowdish, (born May 21, 1976) is a Canadian immunologist and currently a professor in the Department of Pathology and Molecular Medicine at McMaster University in Ontario, Canada.

== Career ==
In 1999, she graduated from the University of Guelph with an Honours Bachelor of Science in microbiology. Bowdish obtained her PhD from the University of British Columbia in 2005. There, under the supervision of Robert E. W. Hancock, she discovered the immunomodulatory role of the host defence peptide LL-37. Bowdish worked at the University of Oxford from 2005-2008 under the supervision of Siamon Gordon where she studied the role of MARCO in eliciting an immune response Mycobacterium tuberculosis.

Bowdish was appointed to the Department of Pathology & Molecular Medicine at McMaster University in 2009. Since, Bowdish has uncovered how aging alters myeloid cells to increase susceptibility to pneumococcal pneumonia, and demonstrated that age-associated gut microbe dysbiosis in mice increases age-associated inflammation.
