= Lyndall Gordon =

South African writer

Lyndall Gordon FRSL
- Citizenship: Cape Town
- Education: University of Cape Town; Columbia University
- Occupations: academic writer, literary biographies
- Notable work: The Hyacinth Girl: T.S. Eliot’s Hidden Muse (2022

Lyndall Gordon FRSL (born 4 November 1941) is a British-based biographical and former academic writer, known for her literary biographies. She is a senior research fellow at St Hilda's College, Oxford.

== Life ==
Born in Cape Town, South Africa, she did her undergraduate studies at the University of Cape Town and her doctorate at Columbia University in New York City. She is married to pathologist Siamon Gordon; they have two daughters.

Gordon is the author of Eliot's Early Years (1977), which won the British Academy's Rose Mary Crawshay Prize; Virginia Woolf: A Writer's Life (1984), which won the James Tait Black Memorial Prize; Charlotte Brontë: A Passionate Life (1994), winner of the Cheltenham Prize for Literature; and Vindication: A Life of Mary Wollstonecraft, shortlisted for the BBC Four Samuel Johnson Prize.

More recent publications include Lives Like Loaded Guns: Emily Dickinson and her Family's Feuds (2010), which has challenged established assumptions about the poet's life; Shared Lives: Growing Up in 50s Cape Town (D. Philip Publishers, 1992); Divided Lives: Dreams of a Mother and a Daughter (London: Virago, 2014); and Outsiders: Five Women Writers Who Changed the World (London: Virago, 2017).

Lives Like Loaded Guns was short-listed for the Duff Cooper Prize and Italy’s Comisso Prize.Divided Lives was long-listed for the Alan Paton prize and the Warwick prize for writing.Outsiders was a finalist for the Prose Award by the American Association of Publishers.

Lyndall's most recent work is The Hyacinth Girl: T.S. Eliot’s Hidden Muse (2022), which was longlisted for the 2023 PEN/Jacqueline Bograd Weld Award for Biography.

Gordon was elected a Fellow of the Royal Society of Literature in 2002.

== Works ==
- Eliot's Early Years. Oxford University Press, 1977. ISBN 978-0-19-812078-0
- Virginia Woolf: A Writer's Life. Oxford University Press. 1984. ISBN 978-0-19-811723-0.; W. W. Norton & Company, 2001, ISBN 978-0-393-32205-7
- Eliot's New Life. Oxford University Press, 1988
- Shared Lives. Norton, 1992. ISBN 978-0-393-03164-5
- Charlotte Brontë: A Passionate Life Chatto & Windus, 1994. ISBN 978-0-7011-6137-8; Little, Brown Book Group, 2009. ISBN 978-0-7481-1453-5
- A Private Life of Henry James: Two Women and His Art. Chatto & Windus, 1998. ISBN 978-0701161668. Also titled Henry James: His Women and His Art. Virago, 2012, ISBN 978-1-84408-892-8
- T.S. Eliot: An Imperfect Life. W.W. Norton & Company. 1999. ISBN 978-0-393-32093-0.
- Vindication: A Life of Mary Wollstonecraft. HarperCollins. 2005. ISBN 978-0-06-019802-2. 2006. ISBN 978-0-06-095774-2
- Lives Like Loaded Guns: Emily Dickinson and Her Family's Feuds. Penguin. 2010. ISBN 978-0-670-02193-2.
- Divided Lives: Dreams of a Mother and a Daughter. London: Virago, 2014.
- Outsiders: Five Women Writers Who Changed the World. London: Virago, 2017.
- "Dreams of a Mother and Daughter," in Dale Salwak, ed. Writers and Their Mothers. Palgrave Macmillan, 2018. ISBN 978-3-319-68347-8
- The Hyacinth Girl: T.S. Eliot’s Hidden Muse. London: 2022.
