= Caetano Reis e Sousa =

Portuguese scientist (born 1968)

Caetano Reis e Sousa FRS FMedSci
- Born: Caetano Maria Pacheco Pais dos Reis e Sousa; 1968 (age 57–58); Lisbon, Portugal
- Education: Atlantic College
- Alma mater: Imperial College London (BSc); University of Oxford (DPhil)
- Awards: EMBO Member (2006); Louis-Jeantet Prize for Medicine (2017)
- Scientific career
- Fields: Immunology
- Institutions: Francis Crick Institute; Imperial College London; Imperial Cancer Research Fund; National Institute of Allergy and Infectious Diseases
- Thesis: Phagocytosis of antigens by Langerhans cells
- Doctoral advisor: Jonathan Austyn
- Website: www.crick.ac.uk/research/labs/caetano-reis-e-sousa

Caetano Maria Pacheco Pais dos Reis e Sousa (born 1968) is a Portuguese scientist who is a principal group leader at the Francis Crick Institute.

== Education ==
Reis e Sousa was educated at Atlantic College in Wales, Imperial College London (BSc) and the University of Oxford where he was awarded a Doctor of Philosophy degree in 1992 for research on dendritic cells, and the phagocytosis of antigens by Langerhans cells supervised by Jonathan Austyn.

== Career and research ==
After working as a postdoctoral researcher at the National Institute of Allergy and Infectious Diseases (NIAID) in the United States, with Ronald Germain, he joined the Imperial Cancer Research Fund (ICRF) in 1998. He headed the Immunobiology Laboratory which became part of the Francis Crick Institute in 2015. He is also a visiting professor of Immunology at Imperial College London and King's College London and honorary professor at University College London (UCL).

Reis e Sousa's research centres on the mechanisms involved in sensing infection, cancer and tissue injury. He has helped to define the cells and pathways involved in innate immune detection of RNA viruses, fungi and dead cells.

=== Awards and honours ===
Reis e Sousa was elected a Fellow of the Royal Society (FRS) in 2019, and is also a Fellow of the Academy of Medical Sciences (FMedSci), a member of the European Molecular Biology Organization (EMBO) and was made an Officer of the Order of Sant'Iago da Espada by the Government of Portugal in 2009. He was awarded the Liliane Bettencourt Prize for Life Sciences in 2008, Louis-Jeantet Prize for Medicine in 2017 and the Bial Award in Biomedicine in 2019.
