= Shadow Health =

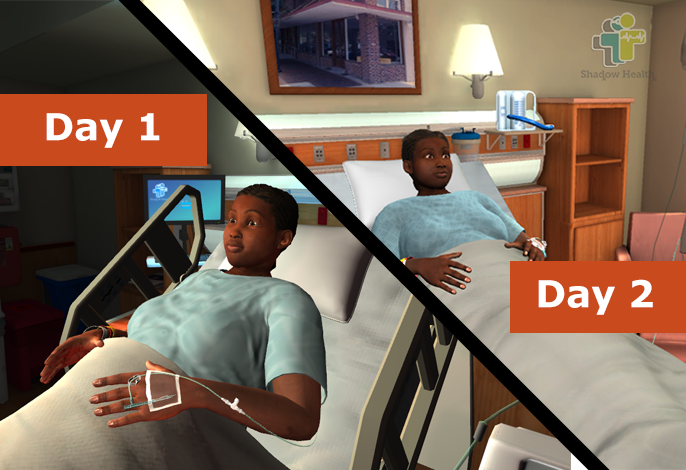
Nursing students care for Digital Standardized Patients within each Digital Clinical Experience

Shadow Health is an educational software developer of learning environments termed "Digital Clinical Experiences™" (DCEs).

Founded in Gainesville, Florida in 2011, Shadow Health claims to offer web-based clinical learning environments for students and faculty in the fields of nursing and healthcare. As a learning management system, each DCE provides educators with administration, documentation and tracking functions to measure student clinical competence and clinical reasoning. Students can also navigate through this "digital clinical experience".

Through the Shadow Health DCE, students engage with " Digital Standardized Patients™ " (DSPs) to attend virtual simulations of patient exams and practice documentation. Upon completion of each virtual patient examination, students are prompted to reflect on their experiences and compare them against an expert's notes. According to a health educator at Drexel University, "what truly makes Shadow Health unique, however, is that Tina [Shadow Health's main DSP character] acts like a real patient by responding to how she is treated, approached or the type of questions she is asked by the student practitioner"

The Shadow Health claims to include "cross-functional teams using agile management" in its work environment. Shadow Health is a graduate of The Innovation Hub, a local incubator hub opened in 2011, whose tenants are claimed to have "created more than 760 jobs and drawn more than $50 million in private investment funds" Shadow Health has been named as one of the "2014 Florida Companies to watch". It moved to larger office spaces in 2012 and again in December 2015.
