= Firestone Institute for Respiratory Health =

Canadian health organization

Coordinates: 43.2428°N 79.8828°W

- Formation: 1978
- Location: Hamilton, Ontario, Canada
- Region served: Hamilton Niagara Haldimand Brant
- Official language: English
- Executive Director: Dr. Dawn Bowdish
- Research Director: Dr. Martin Kolb
- Affiliations: St. Joseph's Healthcare Hamilton, McMaster University Medical School, McMaster University
- Staff: 30+
- Website: firh.ca

The Firestone Institute for Respiratory Health (FIRH) is a center for the investigation and treatment of respiratory diseases. Based out of St. Joseph's Healthcare in Hamilton, Ontario, Canada, the institute is a clinical facility with strong research directions. FIRH faculty are also heavily involved at McMaster University with education at the undergraduate, graduate, post-graduate and continuing medical education levels.

== History ==
Founded in 1978 as the Firestone Regional Chest and Allergy Unit (FRCAU), the institute was designated as the Regional Referral Center by the District Health Council. The institute has maintained this designation, and as of 2006, it services the Hamilton Niagara Haldimand Brant Local Health Integration Network, a community of 1.4 million people. The institute's research developed in collaboration with clinical activities in order to comprehensively investigate mechanisms and outcomes. Accordingly, a number of asthma and COPD initiatives were launched, including the development of standardized techniques for symptom assessment, airflow limitation and bronchial hyperresponsiveness. Further investigations have included studies of exercise and allergen-induced bronchoconstriction as well as epidemiological studies examining the relationship between prevalence of respiratory illness and pollution. From 2004-2005, the institute was relocated to four floors of the brand new Juravinski Innovation Tower, where more modern research laboratories and expanded clinical facilities were available.

In early March 2009, Firestone researchers demonstrated that an experimental drug, mepolizumab can help reduce eosinophil production in sufferers of severe asthma. The study, published in the New England Journal of Medicine found that treatment with mepolizumab allowed these patients to cut back on treatments of prednisone.

== Education ==
The FIRH has trained over 100 graduate students and post-doctoral fellows. In addition to this, the FIRH faculty currently teach numerous undergraduate and postgraduate courses at McMaster University.

== Research pursuits ==
The following is a list of the research areas currently being investigated at the FIRH:

- Population studies of asthma epidemiology and causation
- Studies of asthma management utilizing biomarkers of inflammation
- Investigation of novel pharmaceutical therapies for asthma
- Investigation of novel procedural therapies for asthma and COPD
- Mechanisms of airway hyperresponsiveness and airway remodelling
- Trafficking and lung homing of bone-marrow derived hemopoietic stem cells in allergic asthma and COPD
- Immunobiology of allergic asthma
- Control of airway and vascular smooth muscle structure, function and intracellular signalling
- COPD epidemiology and treatment
- COPD and Respiratory Rehabilitation
- Pathobiology of pulmonary fibrosis
- Clinical trial center for idiopathic pulmonary fibrosis
- Functional and structural imaging of the lung
- Chronic cough
