= Michael G. DeGroote School of Medicine =

Medical school of McMaster University in Ontario, Canada

Coordinates: 43.261054°N 79.91678°W

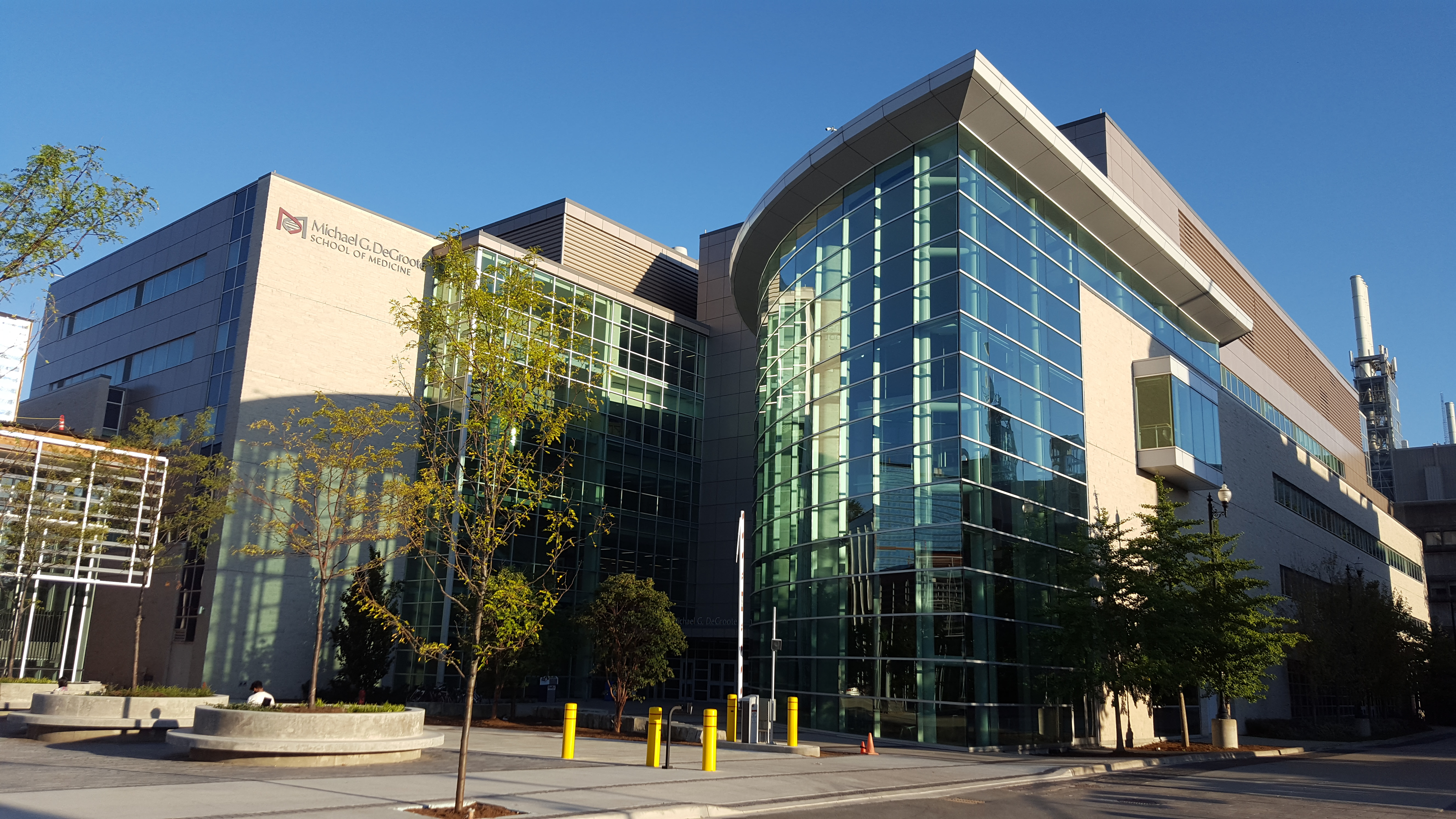
- Former name: School of Medicine (1965–2004)
- Type: Public medical school
- Established: 1965; 61 years ago
- Parent institution: McMaster Faculty of Health Sciences
- Dean: Paul O'Byrne
- Students: 203 per year
- Location: Hamilton, Ontario, Canada
- Website: Official website

The Michael G. DeGroote School of Medicine is the medical school of McMaster University in Hamilton, Ontario, Canada. It is operated by the McMaster Faculty of Health Sciences. It is one of two medical programs in Canada that operates on an accelerated 3-year MD program instead of the traditional 4-year MD program, along with the University of Calgary.

In 2021, McMaster ranked 11th in the world and was tied for second in Canada in the clinical and health category of the Times Higher Education World University Rankings. In 2012, McMaster ranked 14th in the world and 1st in Canada in medicine, according to the Times Higher Education Rankings.

The school received 5,605 applications for the Class of 2025, the most applications of any medical school in Canada, and had an acceptance rate of 3.6%. The average cumulative GPA of entering undergraduates in the Class of 2027 was 3.92 and the average MCAT Critical Analysis and Reasoning Skills (CARS) score was 129, a score in the 95th percentile. Unlike many other medical schools, McMaster's medical school does not drop any courses or years in their GPA calculation, and only uses the CARS section of the MCAT in their admissions evaluation. Students also have to write the CASPer admissions test, first developed by McMaster in 2010.

Since its formation in 1965, the school has used the small-group, case-based learning curriculum invented at McMaster, which is now known as PBL or problem-based learning. In addition, the school was the first in the world to institute a 3-year M.D. program in 1969, with classes being held year round. In the 1980s, McMaster developed and coined the term "evidence-based medicine" as a way to approach clinical problem solving. McMaster also developed the Multiple Mini Interview (MMI) system in 2001 for medical school admissions which has been adopted as part of the admissions process for professional schools around the world. In 2010, McMaster developed the CASPer test for medical school admissions, which has been adopted by over 70 medical, dental and nursing schools worldwide.

== History ==
McMaster University had long been a target of proposals for a medical school. As early as 1892, Trinity Medical College in Toronto had sought affiliation with McMaster. In the 1930s, Dr. C.E. Cooper-Cole and Dr. Gordon Murray were invited to become the first professors of medicine and surgery at the university. However, the plans were later shelved. In 1956, Sir Francis R. Fraser, wrote the Fraser report and concluded that McMaster could feasibly host a medical school. At the same time, the Ontario government had expressed the opinion that Ontario would need an additional medical school by 1966. The main driving force behind the project was Harry Thode, at the time the vice president of the university and later, the president. By 1965, the first dean of the new medical school John Robert Evans, was appointed. By 1966, the first five faculty members, John Robert Evans, William Walsh, Bill Spaulding, James Anderson and Fraser Mustard were recruited. The school would welcome its first class in the fall of 1969, graduating its first students in May 1972.

== Facilities and teaching sites ==
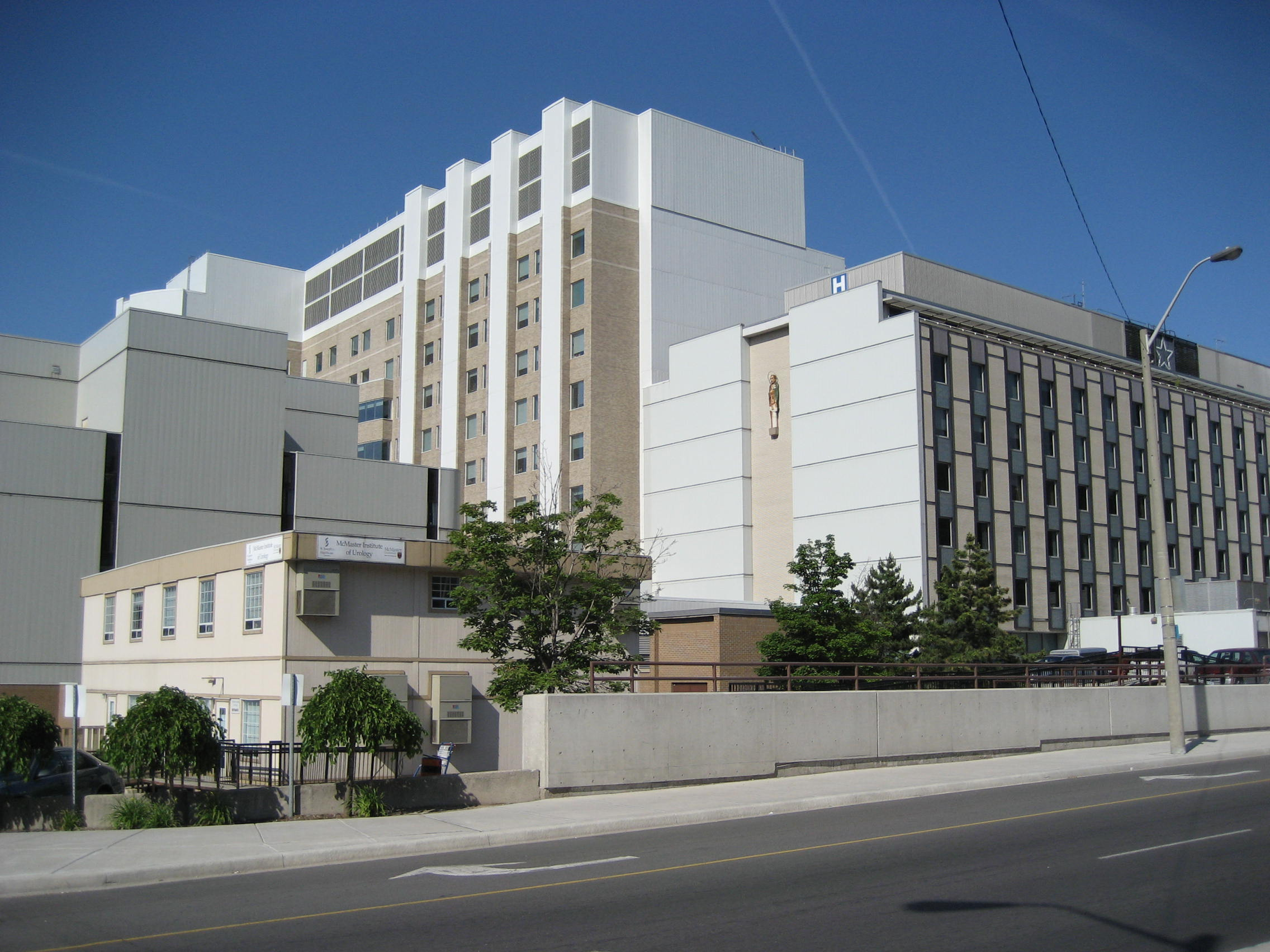
St. Joseph's Hospital, Charlton Campus.

The school is located at McMaster University's main campus in Hamilton, Ontario, housed within the Michael G. DeGroote Centre for Learning and Discovery, a building built in 2004 and the adjacent Health Sciences Centre. The DeGroote facility is shared with the Centre for Function Genomics, Centre for Gene Therapeutics, Institute for Cancer and Stem Cell Biology Research, Robert E. Fitzhenry Vector Laboratory, Centre for Asthma and Allergy Research (Allergen) and North American Headquarters for West Nile studies, as well as the Bachelor of Health Sciences undergraduate program.

In 2016, the medical school opened the David Braley Health Sciences Centre, a 192,000 square foot building, to be used by the Family Medicine department, Hamilton Public Health and other various academic divisions of the medical school.

The medical school currently operates three campuses: the main Hamilton campus; the Waterloo Regional Campus located on the Health Sciences Campus of the University of Waterloo in downtown Kitchener, Ontario; and the Niagara Regional Campus located on the main campus of Brock University in St. Catharines, Ontario. All three campuses offer the same curriculum and lead to the same degree, but differ in patient populations and teaching locations.

McMaster's teaching hospitals are divided into two major hospital groupings: Hamilton Health Sciences, recently ranked 2nd in Canada among research hospitals and St. Joseph's Healthcare Hamilton.

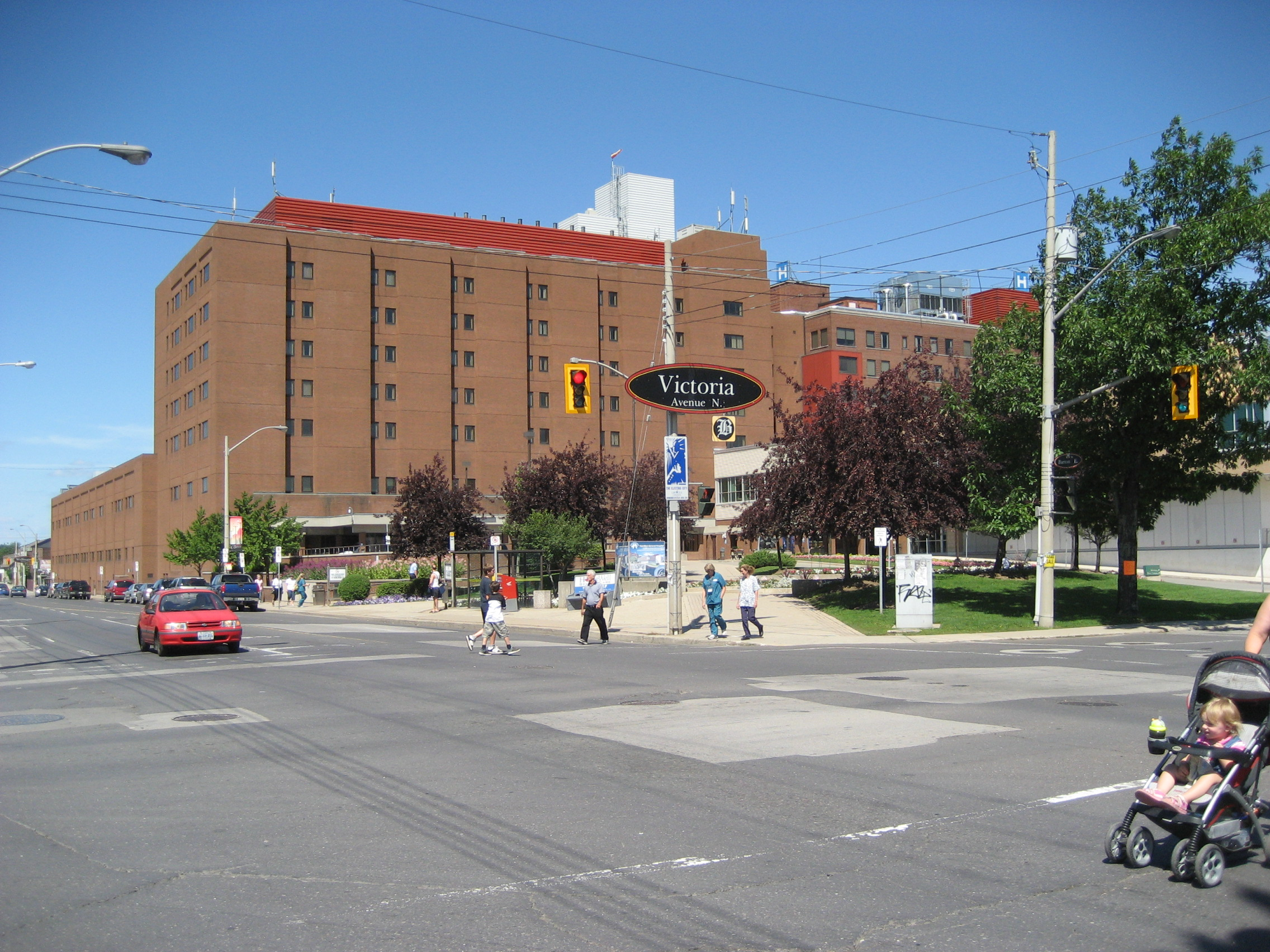
Hamilton General Hospital

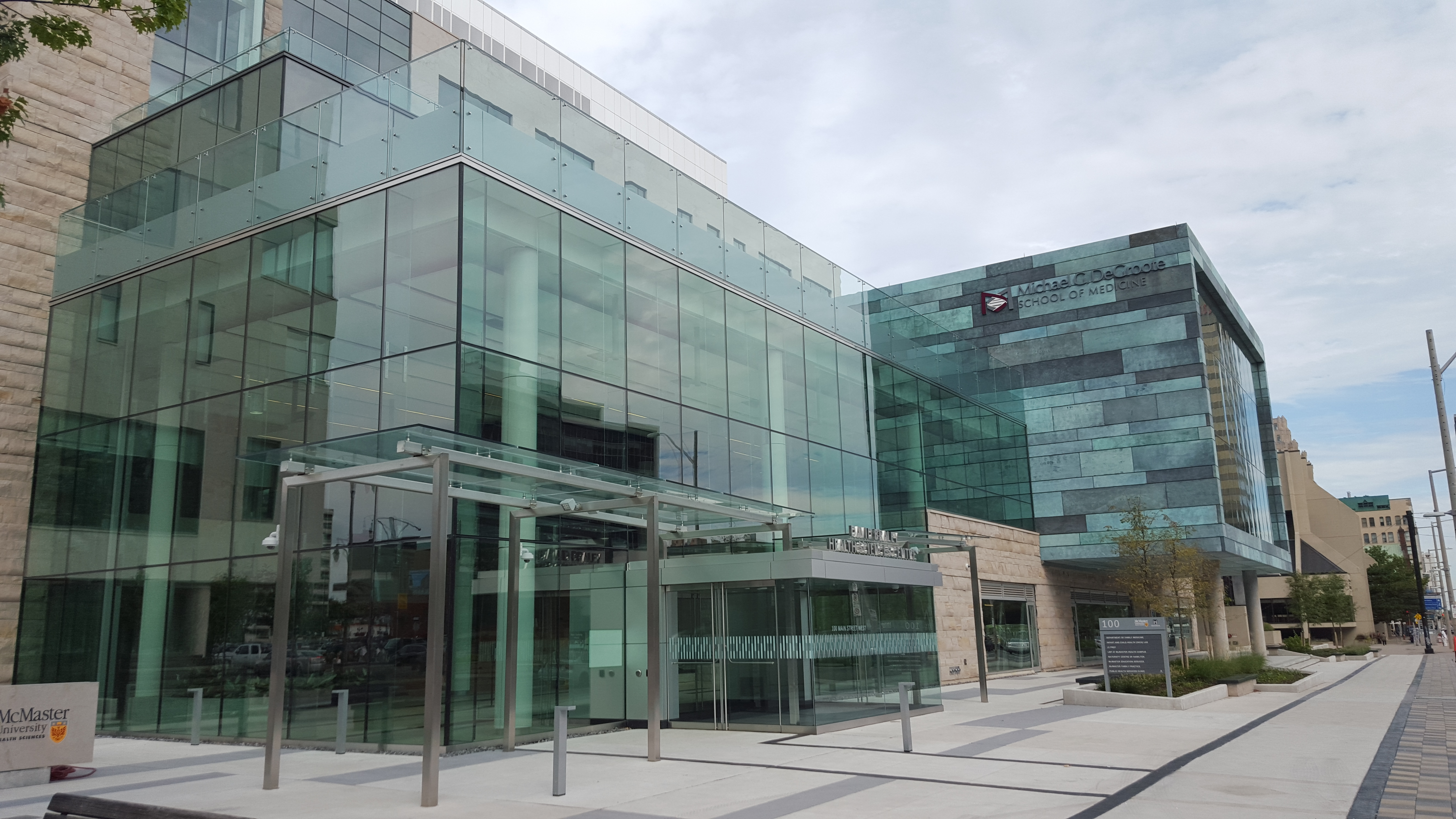
David Braley Health Sciences Centre

McMaster University teaching hospitals
| Institution | Main specialty | Number of Beds | Affiliated research arm |
|---|---|---|---|
| Hamilton General Hospital | Cardiology, Cardiac Surgery, Plastic Surgery, Emergency Medicine, Trauma, Rehabilitation, Neurology, Neurosurgery | 607 | David Braley Cardiac, Vascular and Stroke Research Institute, Population Health Research Institute |
| St. Joseph's Hospital Charlton Campus | Nephrology, Urology, Pulmonology, Thoracic Surgery, Obstetrics and Gynecology, Neurosurgery, Otolaryngology, Ophthalmology | 700+ | Father Sean O'Sullivan Research Centre, Brain Body Institute, McMaster Institute for Surgical Invention, Innovation and Education, Firestone Institute for Respiratory Health, McMaster Institute of Urology, Hamilton Centre for Kidney Research |
| St. Joseph's Hospital West 5th Campus | Psychiatry | 305 | |
| McMaster University Medical Centre and McMaster Children's Hospital | Obstetrics and Gynecology, Pediatrics | 405 | |
| Juravinski Hospital and Cancer Centre | Oncology, Orthopedic Surgery, Hepatobiliary Surgery | 228 | Escarpment Cancer Research Institute |
| St. Peter's Hospital | Rehabilitation, Geriatrics | 250 | |

The school is also affiliated with the following Ontario hospitals, where students rotate and train during their clerkship:

- St. Mary's General Hospital
- Grand River Hospital
- Joseph Brant Hospital
- Brantford General Hospital
- Cambridge Memorial Hospital
- West Lincoln Memorial Hospital
- Niagara Health System (Greater Niagara, Niagara-on-the Lake, Port Colborne Campuses)
- Oakville-Trafalgar Memorial Hospital
- Grey Bruce Health Services
- Norfolk General Hospital
- Brampton Civic Hospital
- Markham Stouffville Hospital
- Mackenzie Richmond Hill Hospital
- Southlake Regional Health Centre

== Educational influence ==
The medical school is a pioneer in its teaching and admissions philosophies through the Program for Educational Research and Development. McMaster created a revolution in health care training by pioneering the problem-based learning (PBL) curriculum, which has since influenced health care education worldwide. The instructional strategy focuses on student-driven learning, which occurs in groups. Most medical schools in North America have adopted PBL in varying degrees into their curriculum.

In the early 1990s, the School of Medicine developed the personal progress index (PPI) as an objective method for assessing acquisition and retention of knowledge for students in the medical program. The PPI is administered at routine intervals to all students in the program, regardless of their level of training, and plots students' increases in scores as they move through the program. Students typically score under 15% on their first write, and increase 5-7% with each successive write. Students are able to monitor the changes in their scores and receive formative feedback based on a standardized score relative to the class mean. Due to the overwhelming success and research supporting the use of the PPI as an evaluation tool, it is now used in Canada, US, Europe, and Australia.

In 2004, McMaster developed the multiple-mini interview to address long standing concerns over the standard panel interviews as being poor reflectors of performance in medical school. This format uses short, independent assessments in a timed circuit to obtain aggregate scores in interpersonal skills, professionalism, ethical/moral judgment, and critical thinking to assess candidates. The MMI has consistently shown to have a higher predictive validity for future performance than traditional interviews. By 2008, the MMI was being used as an admissions test for the majority of medical schools in Canada, Australia, and Israel, as well as other medical schools in the United States and Asia.

In 2010, McMaster began using a computer-based simulated test known as CASPer as an admissions tool at the pre-interview stage. This is an assessment of interpersonal and decision-making skills that is more reliable, and predicts much more validity than standard autobiographical submissions. The test involves several video clips lasting 1–2 minutes in length, followed by situational challenges and self-descriptive questions that may or may not be related to the preceding video clip.

== Admissions ==
The acceptance rate for McMaster University's medical school was 3.8% in 2017. The Michael G. DeGroote School of Medicine received over 5200 applications in 2014 for a class size of approximately 200 students. The average GPA of entering undergraduates in the Class of 2017 was 3.83 and the average MCAT verbal score was 11 (95th percentile).

== Curriculum ==
The program is divided into two parts: the pre-clerkship curriculum and the clerkship curriculum, each spanning half of the three years. The pre-clerkship curriculum is divided into five medical foundations, where students meet with a faculty member twice a week in a small group setting for teaching. Learning is done using the problem-based learning approach, where students set objectives, complete independent research, and then use their small group sessions to teach others, ask questions, and challenge one another with the guidance of their tutor. Students also complete clinical skills and professional competencies training at this time. Students are not graded during pre-clerkship. Evaluations are given at the end of each medical foundation. Feedback from the students' tutors is given on tests and the PPI (personal progress index test) provides the student with a sense of their progress during pre-clerkship.

The clerkship curriculum consists of a rotating schedule. Students move through various medical disciplines. These include: Internal Medicine, Family Medicine, Emergency Medicine, Pediatrics, Surgery, Psychiatry, Obstetrics and Gynecology, Anesthesia, and a number of elective blocks for specialties of interest to the individual student. In their third year, students apply to the Canadian Resident Matching Service (CaRMS) for residency training after completion of the MD Program.

Students are allowed to take an enrichment year that can last up to twelve months. Students can pursue academic work during that period, including research. In addition, up to 40% of the time is available for clinical electives. Students can also pursue a master's degree at McMaster or other universities during that period.

98% of McMaster graduates matched to a residency position in the first iteration of the match in 2016.

=== International health electives ===
McMaster students have 24 weeks of elective time to pursue at McMaster or elsewhere. McMaster encourages students to participate in electives abroad. Students routinely travel all over the world including to countries like South Africa, Uganda, UK, Germany, United States, China, India, Japan and South Korea. Most electives are organized through external organizations or through the students own arrangements, however, McMaster has agreements with different medical universities/cities for medical electives abroad. Currently, McMaster has arranged bilateral exchange agreements with the following universities and cities:

- Royal College of Surgeons of Ireland - 8 spots
- University of Limerick - 2 spots
- University of Sydney - 4 spots
- King George's Medical University/Shri Guru Ram Rai Institute of Medical & Health Sciences - 4 spots
- Seoul National University
- Lima, Peru - 10 spots
- Matangwe, Kenya - 4 spots

== Research ==
McMaster's Faculty of Health Sciences oversees $223 million a year in research, ranking it 2nd in Canada for 5 years in a row. McMaster's Hamilton Health Sciences hospital group is ranked 1st in Canada for researcher intensity with each researcher bringing in $711,000. It is also ranked 2nd in Canada in the top 40 research hospitals list. McMaster is considered a leader in clinical epidemiology and thrombosis research with names like Dr. Jack Hirsh, Dr. Salim Yusuf leading the way. The American Society of Hematology and McMaster University are collaborating to release the official guidelines on the treatment of venous thromboembolism in 2017. In Thomson Reuters list of the World's most influential scientific minds in 2016, McMaster medical school had 9 different scientists mentioned with Prof. Gordon Guyatt mentioned in two different categories.

- In 2010, McMaster scientists discovered how to turn adult skin cells into adult blood cells
- In 2015, McMaster scientists discovered how to turn adult blood cells into adult sensory neurons
- In 2017, McMaster researchers conducted the multinational PURE study, which demonstrated that a low fat diet was associated with a higher risk of premature death, this study was ranked the top article of 2017 by Altmetric

Population Health Research Institute

McMaster's Faculty of Health Sciences is home to 30 research institutes including the:

- Population Health Research Institute
- Firestone Institute for Respiratory Health
- McMaster Stem Cell and Cancer Research Institute
- Michael G. DeGroote Institute for Infectious Disease Research
- Farncombe Family Digestive Health Research Institute
- Thrombosis & Atherosclerosis Research Institute
- Escarpment Cancer Research Institute
- Michael G. DeGroote Institute for Pain Research and Care
- The Offord Center for Child Studies
- Geriatric Education and Research in Aging Sciences (GERAS) Centre
- Clinical Research Laboratory and Biobank [CRLB]

McMaster initiated its M.D./Ph.D. program in 2007, accepting up to three students a year into the 7 year physician scientist program.

== Funding ==
In 2003, McMaster University Medical School received the largest ever donation to a university in Canadian history when Michael DeGroote donated $105 million to the medical school in the process naming it the Michael G. DeGroote School of Medicine. In 2014, DeGroote donated an additional $50 million to the medical school.

Charles Juravinski has donated over $43 million to Hamilton area hospitals including the Juravinski Hospital. In 2019, the Juravinski's pledged to donate an additional $100 million to the medical school and create the Juravinski Research Centre, funding research in areas including cancer, mental health, lung and respiratory care and diseases of aging.

David Braley, owner of the BC Lions, donated $50 million to the medical school in 2007 to build the Braley Health Sciences Centre, a human embryonic stem cell library and an endowment fund.

In 2011 and 2012, the Boris Family donated a total of $41 million to McMaster University Medical School and St. Joseph's Healthcare Hamilton to found the Boris Family Centre in Human Stem Cell Therapies, establish two chairs in Blood and Neural Stem Cells, found the Boris Clinic, fund alcohol addiction research and buy a surgical robot.

In 2022, Marnix Heersink, donated $32 million to the medical school to build the Marnix E. Heersink School of Biomedical Innovation and Entrepreneurship and the Mary Heersink Centre for Global Health.

== Notable alumni ==
| Name | Class year | Notability | Reference(s) |
|---|---|---|---|
| Andrew Padmos | MD 1972 | Canadian physician and CEO of the Royal College of Physicians and Surgeons of Canada | |
| Daniel Sauder | MD 1975, Prof. Dermatology 1982-1990 | Canadian dermatologist and Chair of Dermatology at Johns Hopkins School of Medicine, developed the field of cutaneous cytokine biology | |
| Roberta Bondar | MD 1977 | Canadian astronaut and physician, NASA's space medicine researcher, first Canadian female astronaut, member of the Canadian Medical Hall of Fame | |
| Gordon Guyatt | MD 1977, Prof. Clinical Epidemiology and Biostatistics | Canadian epidemiologist and physician, coined the term "Evidence-based medicine", member of the Canadian Medical Hall of Fame | |
| Nancy Fern Olivieri | MD 1978 | Canadian hematologist, demonstrated the negative effects of deferiprone on the liver | |
| Stan Kutcher | BA 1974, MA 1975, MD 1979 | Canadian senator and psychiatrist, developed the Kutcher Adolescent Depression Scale. | |
| Vincenzo Di Nicola | MD 1981 | Italian-Canadian psychologist, psychiatrist and philosopher of psychiatry, Founder & President of the Canadian Association of Social Psychiatry and President-Elect of the World Association of Social Psychiatry. | |
| Martin Schechter | MD 1981 | Canadian epidemiologist and noted HIV and addiction researcher, founding director of the School of Population and Public Health, Faculty of Medicine, University of British Columbia (UBC), awarded the Order of British Columbia and co-founded the Canadian Academy of Health Sciences. | |
| John Cameron Bell | PhD 1982 | Canadian cancer researcher, co-founder and chief scientific officer of Jennerex | |
| Eric Hoskins | BSc 1982, MD 1984 | Former Minister of Health in Ontario, founder and president of War Child Canada | |
| Ross Upshur | MD 1986 | Canadian physician, Director of the University of Toronto Joint Centre for Bioethics | |
| Richard Heinzl | MD 1987 | Canadian physician, founder of the Canadian chapter of Doctors without Borders, founder of Medispecialist.com | |
| Suparna Bannerjee | MD 1989 | Canadian physician, founder of the Canadian chapter of Bannerjee Health | |
| James Orbinski | MD 1990 | Canadian physician, President of Médecins Sans Frontières, co-founder of Dignitas International | |
| Philip Steven Wells | Hematology Fellow 1989-1991, MSc 1994, Staff hematologist 1991-1994 | Canadian hematologist, created the Wells risk score for pulmonary embolism and deep vein thrombosis | |
| Samantha Nutt | MD 1994 | Canadian physician, executive director of War Child Canada, winner of the Queen Elizabeth II Diamond Jubilee Medal | |
| Richard Whitlock | BSc 1997, Cardiac Surgery Residency 2001-2007, Critical Care Fellow 2007-2008, PhD 2012, Associate Prof. 2012-Present | Canadian surgeon, performed the first transcatheter aortic valve implantation on a pregnant woman in the world, lead author of the LAAOS III study which demonstrated the superiority of left atrial appendage occlusion during cardiac surgery in preventing stroke. | |
| Teresa M. Chan | Emergency Medicine Residency 2008-2013, Associate Prof. 2018-Present | Canadian emergency medicine physician, founding Dean of the Toronto Metropolitan University School of Medicine. | |

== Notable faculty ==
- James Fraser Mustard, CC, Chair of Pathology (1966–1972), Dean of Medicine (1972–1982), discovered the effect of aspirin in reducing myocardial infarction rates, founder and president of the Canadian Institute for Advanced Research
- John Evans, CC, Dean of Medicine (1966–1972), President of the University of Toronto, Chairman of the Rockefeller Foundation and Director of the Population, Health and Nutrition department of the World Bank
- David Sackett, Chair of Clinical Epidemiology and Biostatistics (1967–1994), founded the first department of Clinical Epidemiology in Canada, wrote Evidence-Based Medicine: How to Practice and Teach EBM now in its 4th edition and Clinical Epidemiology: How to Do Clinical Practice Research now in its 3rd edition
- Howard Barrows, Assistant Dean for Residency Education (1971–1980), pioneered problem-based learning at McMaster which has now spread all over the world
- Arnold Johnson, Professor of Cardiology (1974–1983), performed the first cardiac heart catheterization in Canada, founder of McMaster's Department of Cardiology
- John Coleman Laidlaw, Professor of Endocrinology (1975–1986), Dean of Medicine (1981–1985), founded the Institute of Medical Science at University of Toronto
- Moran Campbell, Chair of Medicine (1968–1975), inventor of the Venturi mask
- Jack Hirsh, professor emeritus of Medicine (1973–Present), winner of the Canada Gairdner International Award in 2000 for discovering the effectiveness of heparin in deep vein thrombosis and the discovery of low molecular weight heparin
- Charles Gordon Roland, Hannah Professor of the History of Medicine (1977–1999), President of the Canadian Society for the History of Medicine and noted authority on Sir William Osler
- John Bienenstock, Dean and Vice President of Health Sciences (1992–1996), characterized mucosal mast cells and bronchus associated lymphoid tissues
- Salim Yusuf, Professor of Medicine (1992–Present), world's second most cited researcher, prolific clinical trials physician in cardiovascular diseases
- John G. Kelton, Dean of Medicine (2001–2016), Dean and vice-president of the Faculty of Health Sciences (2001–2016), hematologist and expert in heparin-induced thrombocytopenia
- Dave Williams, Professor of Surgery (2008–2011), Canadian astronaut and physician, Director of the Space and Life Sciences Directorate at the Johnson Space Center
- John Basmajian, OC, OOnt, Professor of Medicine (1977–1986), pioneer in electromyography and biofeedback
- Stuart Lyon Smith, Professor of Medicine (1967–1975), Leader of the Ontario Liberal Party, Chairman of the Science Council of Canada
- Donald Acheson, KBE, Visiting professor of medicine (1977), Chief Medical Officer of the United Kingdom and coined the term "Benign Myalgic Encephalomyelitis"
- Paul O'Byrne, Dean of Medicine (2016–Present), Dean and vice-president of the Faculty of Health Sciences (2016–Present), respirologist and expert in allergy induced asthma

== In popular culture ==
- In 2018, The magazine Maclean's wrote an article about McMaster's innovative medical curriculum
- In 2017, On the TV show Amazing Race Canada, it was publicly revealed that Sam Lambert, one of that season's contestants, had been accepted to the medical school in the class of 2020
- In 2015, McMaster's medical school was part of an eight part international documentary series entitled Canada's New Doctors, by Al-Jazeera and Companion Media and Culture Co. in China, examining the topic of how to best train medical professionals
- In 2012, McMaster medical students starred in a one-hour documentary by OMNI Television called M.D(iversity)
- In 2009, The Rick Mercer Report filmed a segment about McMaster University, visiting the medical school to see its new clinical skills models
- In 2004, The magazine Saturday Night published a report on PBL and McMaster Medical School's innovative curriculum
