= Paul O'Byrne =

Professor Paul O'Byrne OC FRCPC FRCPI FRCPE FRCPGlas

Dean, Michael G. DeGroote School of Medicine, McMaster University
- Incumbent
- Assumed office 2016

E. J. Moran Professor of Respiratory Medicine, McMaster University
- In office 1998–2016

Personal details
- Born: Paul Myles O'Byrne Ireland
- Occupation: Respirologist

Paul Myles O'Byrne is an Irish-Canadian respirologist, the Dean and vice-president of the Faculty of Health Sciences and Dean of the Michael G. DeGroote School of Medicine at McMaster University. He was the E.J. Moran Chair of Respiratory Medicine at McMaster University Medical School from 1998 to 2016.

== Early life and education ==
O'Byrne was born in Ireland and grew up in South Africa. He was a childhood asthmatic and that inspired him to pursue asthma research. He went to medical school at University College Dublin and completed his residency in internal medicine and fellowship in respiratory medicine at McMaster University. He completed further research fellowship training at McMaster University and at the Cardiovascular Research Institute in San Francisco.

== Career ==
O'Byrne returned to McMaster and conducted asthma research. In 1998, he was appointed to the E.J. Moran Chair of Respiratory Medicine at the university and in 2002 he was the executive director of the Firestone Institute for Respiratory Health and the Chair of the Department of Medicine at McMaster University. He relinquished both titles upon being appointed to his new role as Dean and vice-president of the Faculty of Health Sciences in 2016.

He was appointed as an Officer of the Order of Canada in 2023. He currently resides in Ancaster, Ontario.

== Research ==
O'Byrne has published over 400 papers and authored 98 book chapters and edited 12 books. O'Byrne tested a new antibody called AMG 157 which was shown to be effective at reducing the severity of allergic asthma attacks.
