= Howard Barrows =

American physician and medical educator

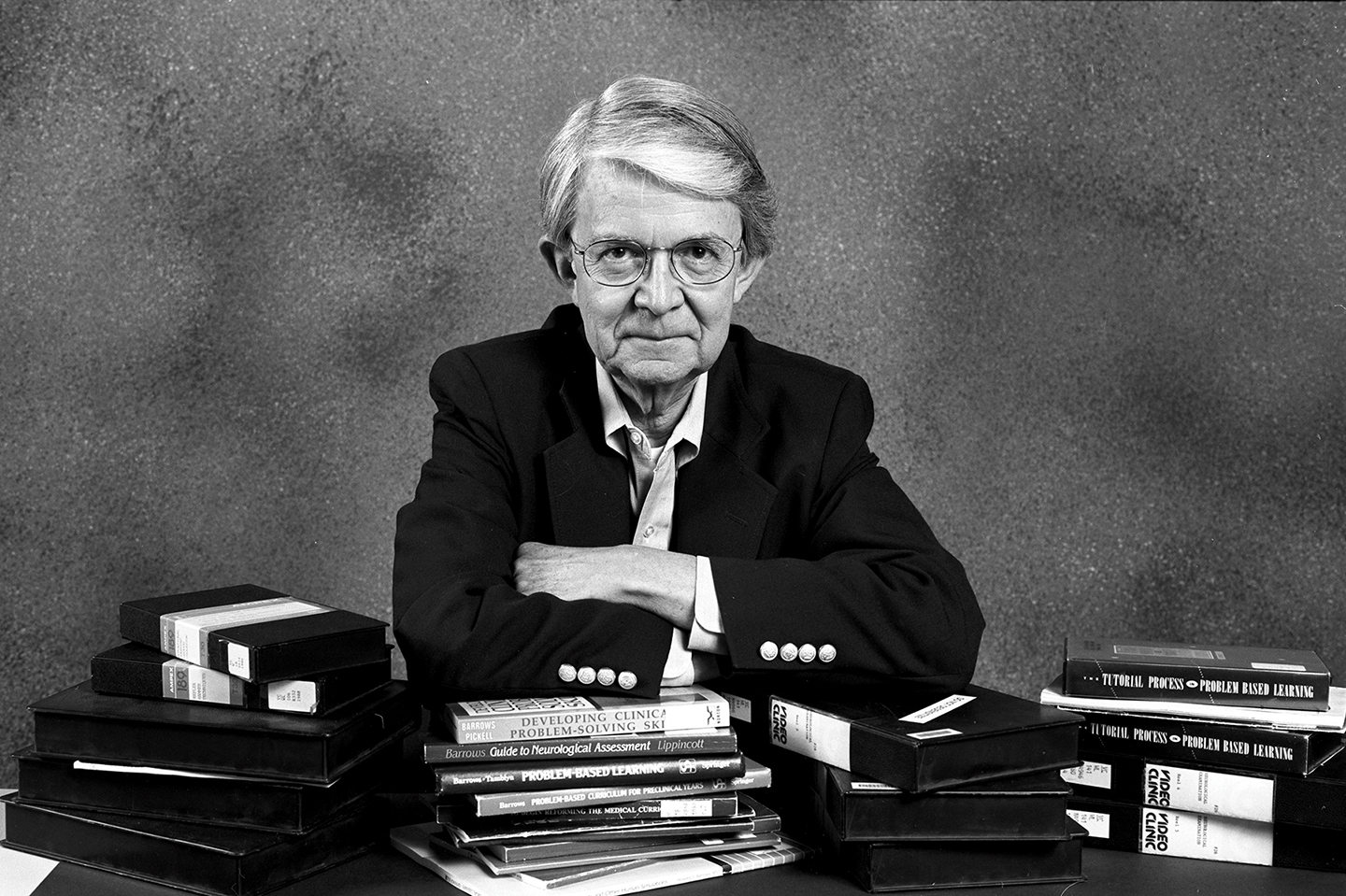

Howard S. Barrows (March 28, 1928 – March 25, 2011) was an American physician and medical educator who was Professor Emeritus at the Southern Illinois University School of Medicine where he had previously served as Associate Dean for Educational Affairs and Chair of Medical Education. Trained as a neurologist, Barrows is best known today for his many innovations in medical education, particularly teaching using Problem-Based Learning (PBL), developed while he was a professor at McMaster University Medical School, assessing clinical skills working with simulated patients, and studying clinical reasoning using stimulated recall techniques.

== Biography ==
Barrows was born in Oak Park, Illinois on March 28, 1928. He attended a community college in San Mateo, California and went on to complete a BA in Zoology at the University of California, Berkeley in 1949. He attended medical school at University of Southern California (USC) College of Medicine and completed his M.D. in 1953. He interned at Lennox Hill Hospital in New York city and subsequently served two years at Parks Air Force Base in California as a medical officer. Barrows returned to New York city in 1957 to complete his residency in neurology at Columbia Presbyterian Medical Center.

Barrows joined the USC faculty in 1960, advancing to the rank of Professor of Neurology. In 1971, he joined the recently founded Faculty of Medicine at McMaster University in Hamilton Ontario. It was at McMaster where he developed the PBL curriculum. A decade later, he was recruited to serve as the Associate Dean for Educational Affairs at Southern Illinois University (SIU) School of Medicine in Springfield, Illinois. At SIU he was instrumental in establishing a PBL track modeled after the Problem-Based Curriculum at McMaster. Under his direction, SIU became a center for the development of PBL teaching materials and faculty training. He played an instrumental role in creating the journal Teaching and Learning in Medicine and served as an associate editor for many years. He also established the Problem-Based Learning Institute in conjunction with the local public school district to promote the use of PBL in secondary education. After his retirement in 1999, Barrows and his wife Phyllis returned to Hamilton, Ontario.

Over his long and productive career, Barrows was to receive a number of awards. He was the first recipient of the John P. Hubbard Award from the National Board of Medical Examiners (NBME) in 1984 and was later to receive the Abraham Flexner award from the Association of American Medical Colleges (AAMC).

== Innovations in medical education ==
Early in his career, Barrows conducted basic research on clinical reasoning processes. When he joined the Faculty of Medicine at McMaster, the undergraduate curriculum was just in the process of being designed. Barrows argued that the teaching of medicine should be organized in a way that emulates the reasoning of a skilled practitioner. Rather than presenting information to students in a decontextualized, discipline-based way, Barrows proposed that students should be allowed to engage new information in the context of solving authentic clinical problems. In the course of exploring a problem, students in a PBL curriculum identify deficiencies in their understanding and identify their own resources for redressing these deficiencies. This is thought to foster skills for lifelong learning.

Traditionally, the assessment of student learning in medical education has relied almost entirely on written exams. But there would seem to be more to being a competent practitioner than could ever be assessed using a paper and pencil test. Barrows' pioneering work on training actors to serve as simulated patients opened the door to a new way of evaluating clinical skills. Simulated patients could be used to test the students' interactional and problem-solving skills. This kind of "performance-based" assessment has now been incorporated into national licensure exams for all U.S. medical students.
