= Multiple mini-interview =

Interview format

In recruitment, the multiple mini-interview (MMI) is an interview format that uses many short independent assessments, typically in a timed circuit, to obtain an aggregate score of each candidate's soft skills. In 2001, the McMaster University Medical School began developing the MMI system, to address two widely recognized problems. First, it has been shown that traditional interview formats or simulations of educational situations do not accurately predict performance in medical school. Secondly, when a licensing or regulatory body reviews the performance of a physician subsequent to patient complaints, the most frequent issues of concern are those of the non-cognitive skills, such as interpersonal skills, professionalism and ethical/moral judgment. Since its formal introduction at McMaster University Medical School in 2004, it has been adopted by medical, dental, pharmacy, and veterinary schools around the world.

== Introduction ==
Interviews have been used widely for different purposes, including assessment and recruitment. Candidate assessment is normally deemed successful when the scores generated by the measuring tool predict for future outcomes of interest, such as job performance or job retention. Meta-analysis of the human resource literature has demonstrated low to moderate ability of interviews to predict for future job performance. How well a candidate scores on one interview is only somewhat correlated with how well that candidate scores on the next interview. Marked shifts in scores are buffered when collecting many scores on the same candidate, with a greater buffering effect provided by multiple interviews than by multiple interviewers acting as a panel for one interview. The score assigned by an interviewer in the first few minutes of an interview is rarely changed significantly over the course of the rest of the interview, an effect known as the halo effect.

Therefore, even very short interviews within an MMI format provide similar ability to differentiate reproducibly between candidates. Ability to reproducibly differentiate between candidates, also known as overall test reliability, is markedly higher for the MMI than for other interview formats. This has translated into higher predictive validity, correlating for future performance much more highly than standard interviews.

== History ==
Aiming to enhance predictive correlations with future performance in medical school, post-graduate medical training, and future performance in practice, McMaster University began research and development of the MMI in 2001. The initial pilot was conducted on 18 graduate students volunteering as "medical school candidates". High overall test reliability (0.81) led to a larger study conducted in 2002 on real medical school candidates, many of whom volunteered after their standard interview to stay for the MMI. Overall test reliability remained high, and subsequent follow-up through medical school and on to national licensure examination (Medical Council of Canada Qualifying Examination Parts I and II) revealed the MMI to be the best predictor for subsequent clinical performance, professionalism, and ability to communicate with patients and successfully obtain national licensure.

Since its formal inception at the Michael G. DeGroote School of Medicine at McMaster University in 2004, the MMI subsequently spread as an admissions test across medical schools, and to other healing arts disciplines. By 2008, the MMI was being used as an admissions test by the majority of medical schools in Canada, Australia, Israel, and Brunei. Also in 2008, a pilot test was conducted with the tool at the University of Cincinnati College of Medicine, and went live in the fall of that year, as the first implementation of MMI at a medical college in the United States; additional medical schools in the country have since adopted the process.

These lead to the development of a McMaster spin-off company, APT Inc., to commercialize the MMI system. The MMI was branded as ProFitHR and made available to both the academic and corporate sector. By 2009, the list of other disciplines using the MMI included schools for dentistry, pharmacy, midwifery, physiotherapy and occupational therapy, veterinary medicine, ultrasound technology, nuclear medicine technology, X-ray technology, medical laboratory technology, chiropody, dental hygiene, and postgraduate training programs in dentistry and medicine.

== MMI procedure ==
1. Interview stations – the domain(s) being assessed at any one station are variable, and normally reflects the objectives of the selecting institution. Examples of domains include the "soft skills" – ethics, professionalism, interpersonal relationships, ability to manage, communicate, collaborate, as well as perform a task. An MMI interview station takes considerable time and effort to produce; it is composed of several parts, including the stem question, probing questions for the interviewer, and a scoring sheet.
2. Circuit(s) of stations – to reduce costs of the MMI significantly below that of most interviews, the interview "stations" are kept short (eight minutes or less) and are conducted simultaneously in a circuit as a bell-ringer examination. The preferred number of stations depends to some extent on the characteristics of the candidate group being interviewed, though nine interviews per candidate represents a reasonable minimum. The circuit of interview stations should be within sufficiently close quarters to allow candidates to move from interview room to interview room. Multiple parallel circuits can be run, each circuit with the same set of interview stations, depending upon physical plant limitations.
3. Interviewers – one interviewer per interview station is sufficient. In a typical MMI, each interviewer stays in the same interview throughout, as candidates rotate through. The interviewer thus scores each candidate based upon the same interview scenario throughout the course of the test.
4. Candidates – each candidate rotates through the circuit of interviews. For example, if each interview station is eight minutes, and there are nine interview stations, it will take the nine candidates being assessed on that circuit 72 minutes to complete the MMI. Each of the candidates begins at a different interview station, rotating to the next interview station at the ringing of the bell.
5. Administrators – each circuit requires at least one administrator to ensure that the MMI is conducted fairly and on time.

== Utility of the MMI ==
Test security breaches tend not to unduly influence results. While the creators of the test claim that sex of candidate and candidate status as under-represented minority tends not to unduly influence results, independent research has demonstrated that the MMI causes both gender and socioeconomic bias. Although some research have suggested that preparatory courses taken by the candidate tend not to unduly influence results, such research has not been duplicated and further research has to be done to make any scientifically sound argument for or against preparatory courses. Furthermore, such research must be designed to directly examine the efficacy of leading preparatory companies' courses rather than general evaluation. Although, it may be argued that all the validation so far has been done by McMaster and/or its affiliated company which constitute a conflict of interest and any result must be interpreted with caution. However, it is worth noting that MMI performance can be compromised by introversion.

== See also ==
- Objective structured clinical examination
