= Jack Hirsh =

Canadian clinician and scientist

- Born: January 7, 1935 (age 91); Melbourne, Australia
- Education: University of Melbourne; Washington University in St. Louis; University of Toronto
- Occupations: clinician and scientist
- Employer: McMaster University
- Awards: Order of Canada

Jack Hirsh CM FRSC (born January 7, 1935) is a Canadian clinician and scientist specializing in anticoagulant therapy and thrombosis.

Born in Melbourne, Australia, Hirsh is a graduate of the University of Melbourne Faculty of Medicine, Dentistry and Health Sciences. He studied hematology at Washington University School of Medicine, the London Postgraduate Medical School and the University of Toronto. In 1973 he joined the McMaster University Medical School. He is also the Director of the Hamilton Civic Hospital Research Centre.

In 1999, he was made a Member of the Order of Canada in recognition for being "one of the best in his field" and "a renowned medical researcher as well as a teacher and administrator". In 2000, he was awarded the International Gairdner Research Award "in recognition of his pioneering contributions to our understanding of the diagnosis, prevention and treatment of thromboembolic disorders." In 2000, he was inducted into the Canadian Medical Hall of Fame. He is also a Fellow of the Royal Society of Canada.
