= John Coleman Laidlaw =

Canadian endocrinologist

Professor John Coleman Laidlaw CM FRCPC FRSC FRCP

Dean of Medicine, McMaster University Medical School
- In office 1981–1985

Personal details
- Born: 1921
- Died: June 6, 2015 (aged 93–94)
- Occupation: Endocrinologist

John Coleman Laidlaw (1921 – June 6, 2015) was a Canadian endocrinologist and the third Dean of Medicine at McMaster University Medical School.

== Education ==
Laidlaw attended the University of Toronto Schools for middle and high school. He was not able to start medical school for 2 years as he was too young for the admissions committee. Eventually, he attended the University of Toronto Faculty of Medicine for medical school and graduated in 1944 with his M.D. degree. He completed his M.A. in biochemistry at the University of Toronto in 1947 and his Ph.D. in biochemistry at the University of London in 1950. He went to Harvard Medical School as an instructor in medicine where he conducted research in endocrinology for 3 years.

== Career ==
In 1953, he returned to Canada to run the Clinical Investigation Unit at the Toronto General Hospital. In 1967, he established the Institute of Medical Sciences at the University of Toronto along with Ernest McCulloch and served as its director from 1967 to 1975. In 1975, he was lured to McMaster University Medical School as a professor of medicine until he was made the third Dean of Medicine and Vice President of Health Sciences in 1981. He held this position until 1985 and retired professor emeritus from McMaster in 1986. From 1986 onwards he served as the Executive Director, Medical Affairs of the Canadian Cancer Society, and Vice-President, Research and Education of OCTRF, now named Cancer Care Ontario.

== Awards ==
- He was named to the Order of Canada in 2003, an honorary Doctor of Science from McMaster University in 2004 and a Fellow of the Royal Society of Canada from the same year
- He was also awarded the Lifetime Achievement Award by University of Toronto in 2014.
