= Jonathan Austyn =

British academic

Jon Austyn
- Born: Jonathan M. Austyn
- Scientific career
- Fields: Immunology
- Workplaces: University of Oxford
- Thesis: Monoclonal antibodies against the murine macrophage (1980)
- Academic advisors: Siamon Gordon
- Doctoral students: Caetano Reis e Sousa
- Website: www.nds.ox.ac.uk/team/jon-austyn

Jonathan M. Austyn is Professor of Immunobiology at the University of Oxford and a Fellow of Wolfson College, Oxford. He has taught immunology over many years, and designed the Master of Science course in Integrated Immunology at the University of Oxford, which he co-directs.

== Education ==
Austyn completed a PhD (research investigating monoclonal antibodies against the murine macrophage) at the University of Oxford, supervised by Siamon Gordon.

== Career and research ==
Austyn has over 25 years research experience of dendritic cell immunology, particularly as applied to transplantation, infectious diseases and cancer. With Gordon MacPherson he co-authored the textbook Exploring Immunology: Concepts and Evidence.

=== Awards and honours ===
Austyn was awarded with distinction the Diploma in Learning and Teaching in Higher Education by the University of Oxford.
