= John G. Kelton =

Canadian hematologist

John G. Kelton CM FRCPC

Dean of the McMaster University Medical School
- In office 2001 – June 2016

Personal details

John G. Kelton is a Canadian hematologist and the former Dean of the McMaster University Medical School, as well as the Dean and Vice-President of the McMaster Faculty of Health Sciences. He concluded his 15-year term in June 2016 and currently serves as the Executive Director of the Michael G. DeGroote Initiative for Innovation in Healthcare at McMaster University in Hamilton. Dr. Kelton is recognized as an expert in heparin-induced thrombocytopenia and is renowned for developing a diagnostic test for heparin-induced thrombocytopenia in 1986.

== Education ==
Kelton graduated medicine cum laude from the Schulich School of Medicine and Dentistry at The University of Western Ontario in 1973. Following graduation he trained in internal medicine and hematology at McMaster University and Duke University School of Medicine. In 1977, he was recruited to McMaster. In 2001, he was made the Dean and Vice-President of the faculty of Health Sciences and the Dean of the medical school.

== Career ==
Kelton is the author of five books, more than eighty book chapters and more than three hundred publications including over fifteen in the New England Journal of Medicine. In 1995, he published a landmark randomized control trial that showed that heparin-induced thrombocytopenia was significantly more common after unfractionated heparin compared to low molecular weight heparin.

== Awards ==
- 2015 Prix Galien Canada Prize with Ted Warkentin for significant advances in pharmaceutical research for work on heparin-induced thrombocytopenia
- Jean Julliard Award from the International Society of Blood Transfusion
- Emily Cooley Award from the American Association of Blood Banks
- Bernard L. Schwartz Award from the Scripps Research Institute
- Karl Landsteiner Award from the German Society of Transfusion Medicine and Immunohematology
- Member of the Order of Canada from the Government of Canada
