= Objective structured clinical examination =

Modern type of examination in medicine, pharmacy and similar disciplines

An objective structured clinical examination (OSCE) is a practical examination format used to assess clinical competence, especially in medicine, pharmacy and other health care disciplines. In an OSCE, candidates rotate through a series of timed stations and complete predefined clinical tasks, such as history taking, physical examination, communication, interpretation of investigations, clinical reasoning, or practical procedures.

The format was developed in the 1970s by Ronald Harden and colleagues as a response to limitations of traditional clinical examinations, including variation in the patients and examiners assigned to candidates. OSCEs are structured through planned stations, standardised instructions, checklists or rating scales, and, in many cases, real or simulated patients.

OSCEs are used in undergraduate, postgraduate, licensing, certification and formative assessment contexts. Although the format is intended to improve standardisation and sampling of clinical skills, its reliability and validity depend on how stations, examiners, scoring criteria and standard-setting procedures are implemented.

== History and purpose ==
The development of OSCE is credited to Ronald Harden. Since the publication of the first paper in the British Medical Journal in 1975, OSCE has been widely adopted in many medical schools and professional bodies. The format of OSCE is continuously evolving and may include real or simulated patients, clinical specimens, and other clinical materials. OSCE is primarily used to assess focused clinical skills such as history taking, physical examination, diagnosis, communication, and counseling.

In the last three decades the OSCE has seen a steady exponential growth and usage in both undergraduate and postgraduate examinations around the globe. OSCEs are also used for licensure examinations and as a feedback tool in formative settings. Common uses of the OSCE include:

- as a performance based assessment tool for testing the minimum accepted standards of students or trainees as barrier (exit) examinations during the undergraduate years in most of the medical schools
- as a postgraduate high stakes assessment tool in Royal College examinations
- as a formative assessment tool in undergraduate medical education
- as a tool for the assessment of graduates seeking highstakes licensure and certification to practise medicine
- as an educational tool to provide immediate feedback

Objective structured clinical examinations evaluate learners "showing how" to perform complex clinical tasks including those infrequently observed and those core to practice.

== Design ==
An OSCE usually consists of a circuit of short stations, usually 5–10 minutes, though some use up to 15 minutes. In each station, the candidate is examined on a one-to-one basis with one or two examiner(s) and either real or simulated (actors or electronic patient simulators) patients. Each station has a different examiner, as opposed to the traditional method of clinical examinations where a candidate would be assigned to one examiner for the entire examination. Candidates rotate through the stations, completing all the stations on their circuit. In this way, all candidates take the same stations. The format was introduced to reduce some limitations of traditional clinical examinations, particularly variation in the patients and examiners assigned to candidates. By using multiple stations, predetermined tasks, checklists and standardised content, OSCEs can sample a wider range of clinical skills and reduce some sources of examiner and case variability.

OSCEs are designed to assess candidates' clinical skills more objectively. This is done by giving all candidates the same stations (though signs of real patients may vary slightly), where they are assessed with the same marking scheme and awarded marks for each step performed correctly. If theoretical knowledge is examined, such as with the examiner asking questions at the end of the station, the questions will also be standardised. The candidate will only be asked questions on the marking scheme, and will not be awarded marks for any other questions asked.

OSCEs are also designed to be structured, with instructions carefully written to ensure that the candidate has a very specific task to complete in each station. Where simulated patients are used, detailed scripts are provided to ensure that the information provided is the same for all candidates, even including the emotions displayed by the patient. The examination is carefully structured to include parts from all elements of the curriculum as well as a wide range of skills.

=== Variation ===
There are several variations of OSCE, those are:

- Objective Structured Practical Examination (OSPE), which assess practical skills, knowledge and/or interpretation of data in non clinical settings.
- Objective Structured Assessment of Technical Skills (OSATS), which designed for objective skills assessment, consisting of a global rating scale and a procedure specific checklist. It is primarily used for feedback or measuring progress of training in surgical specialities.
- Objective Structured Video Examinations (OSVE). The variation consists of videotaped recordings of patient-doctor encounters are shown to students simultaneously and questions related to the video clip are asked. Written answers are marked in a standardised manner.
- Team Objective Structured Clinical Examination (TOSCE). Formative assessment covering common consultations in general practice. A team of students visits each station in a group, performing one task each in a sequence. The candidates are marked for their performance and feedback is provided. The team approach improves efficiency and encourages learning from peers.

Video recording has also been applied within standard OSCEs for post-hoc scoring, re-assessment, and quality assurance. A video-based rating approach has been shown to achieve comparable inter-rater reliability to live assessment. Video-assisted debriefing following simulation stations has been studied as an alternative to verbal debriefing in interprofessional settings. Systematic reviews of peer video feedback in health professions education report generally improved learner reactions, with implementation quality identified as a key variable.

==== Advantages and limitations ====
Compared with traditional long-case or oral clinical examinations, OSCEs can test several components of clinical competence across multiple stations. Harden and Gleeson identified advantages including advance specification of content, wider sampling of skills, reduced dependence on a single patient or examiner, checklist-based scoring, predefined pass criteria, and feedback to students and staff.

The format also has limitations. Station-based assessment can divide clinical competence into separate tasks and may not assess how a candidate manages a whole patient encounter. OSCEs can also be demanding for examiners and patients, and they require more preparation than traditional clinical examinations, including station design, examiner instructions, checklists and, where used, simulated-patient preparation.

Later commentary has emphasized that OSCEs are not automatically objective; their reliability and validity depend on implementation, including station design, examiner training and scoring methods.

== Marking ==
Marking in OSCEs is done by the examiner. Occasionally written stations, for example, writing a prescription chart, are used and these are marked like written examinations, again usually using a standardized mark sheet. One of the ways an OSCE is made objective is by having a detailed mark scheme and standard set of questions. For example, a station concerning the demonstration to a simulated patient on how to use a metered dose inhaler (MDI) would award points for specific actions which are performed safely and accurately. The examiner can often vary the marks depending on how well the candidate performed the step. At the end of the mark sheet, the examiner often has a small number of marks that they can use to weight the station depending on performance and if a simulated patient is used, then they are often asked to add marks depending on the candidates approach. At the end, the examiner is often asked to give a "global score". This is usually used as a subjective score based on the candidates overall performance, not taking into account how many marks the candidate scored. The examiner is usually asked to rate the candidate as pass/borderline/fail or sometimes as excellent/good/pass/borderline/fail. This is then used to determine the individual pass mark for the station.

Many centres allocate each station an individual pass mark. The sum of the pass marks of all the stations determines the overall pass mark for the OSCE. Many centres also impose a minimum number of stations required to pass which ensures that a consistently poor performance is not compensated by a good performance on a small number of stations.

There are, however, criticisms that the OSCE stations can never be truly standardized and objective in the same way as a written exam. It has been known for different patients / actors to afford more assistance, and for different marking criteria to be applied. Finally, it is not uncommon at certain institutions for members of teaching staff be known to students (and vice versa) as the examiner. This familiarity does not necessarily affect the integrity of the examination process, although there is a deviation from anonymous marking. However, in OSCEs that use several circuits of the same stations the marking is repeatedly shown to be very consistent which supports the validity that the OSCE is a fair clinical examination. There are arguments for and against quarantining OSCE examinees to prevent sharing of exam information. Although the data tend to show no improvement in the overall scores in a later OSCE session, the research methodology is flawed and validity of the claim is questionable. A study suggested that marks do not give a sound inference of student collusion in an OSCE.

== Preparation ==
Preparing for OSCEs is very different from preparing for an examination on theory. In an OSCE, clinical skills are tested rather than pure theoretical knowledge. It is essential to learn correct clinical methods, and then practice repeatedly until one perfects the methods whilst simultaneously developing an understanding of the underlying theory behind the methods used. Marks are awarded for each step in the method; hence, it is essential to dissect the method into its individual steps, learn the steps, and then learn to perform the steps in a sequence.

Most hospitals and universities have clinical skills labs where students have the opportunity to practice clinical skills such as taking blood or mobilizing patients in a safe and controlled environment. It is often very helpful to practise in small groups with colleagues, setting a typical OSCE scenario and timing it with one person role playing a patient, one person doing the task and if possible, one person either observing and commenting on technique or even role playing the examiner using a sample mark sheet. Many OSCE textbooks have sample OSCE stations and mark sheets that can be helpful when studying in the manner. In doing this the candidate is able to get a feel of running to time and working under pressure.

In many OSCEs the stations are extended using data interpretation. For example, the candidate may have to take a brief history of chest pain and then interpret an electrocardiogram. It is also common to be asked for a differential diagnosis, to suggest which medical investigations the candidate would like to do or to suggest a management plan for the patient.

The peer-assisted mock OSCE improved tutee confidence, reduced the anxieties associated with OSCEs, and improved candidate confidence for OSCE.

== See also ==
- Health assessment
- Multiple mini-interview
