= Lori Burrows =

Canadian microbiologist

Academic background
- Education: BSc, 1988, PhD, 1993, University of Guelph
- Thesis: Molecular characterization of the RTX cytolysin determinants from gram-negative pathogens of veterinary significance (1994)

Academic work
- Institutions: McMaster University; University of Toronto; University Health Network
- Website: burrowslab.com

Lori Lee Burrows is a Canadian microbiologist. She held a Tier 1 Canada Research Chair in Microbe-Surface Interactions at McMaster University until July 2026, when she retired. She remains Professor Emerita.

== Early life and education ==
Burrows completed her Bachelor of Science degree and PhD at the University of Guelph. Upon completing her degrees, she was a Natural Sciences and Engineering Research Council of Canada Industrial Fellow with Langford Inc. and a Cystic Fibrosis Canada Kinsmen Postdoctoral Fellow.

== Career ==
=== University of Toronto ===
Following her fellowships, Burrows became an assistant professor in the Department of Surgery at the University of Toronto and served as a scientist in the Hospital for Sick Children's Research Institute. She also served as Director of the Centre for Infection and Biomaterials Research at Toronto General Hospital. As a new faculty member, Burrows received the Connaught New Staff Matching Award and received the Dean's Fund Competition for New Staff Award. While at Sick Children's, Burrows oversaw research into Pseudomonas aeruginosa and how the bacteria attach themselves to surfaces. In 2002, she received a two-year grant from the Kidney Foundation of Canada for her project, "Development of anti-microbial coatings for peritoneal catheters suitable for simultaneous exchange procedures." She then received the 2003 George Armstrong-Peters Prize as a "young investigator who has shown outstanding productivity during his/her initial period as an independent investigator as evidenced by research publications in peer reviewed journals, grants held, and students trained." In 2004, Burrows received the Elsie Winifred Crann Memorial Trust Award in Medical Research and was invited to be a member of the Grants Review panels of the Canadian Institutes of Health Research and the National Institutes of Health. In 2005 she received a prestigious CIHR New Investigator salary award.

=== McMaster University ===
Burrows left the University of Toronto in 2006 to join McMaster University as a professor in the Department of Biochemistry and Biomedical Sciences where she focused her research on studying biofilms and Type IV pili (T4P), and how bacteria become resistant to antibiotics. Her laboratory also began investigating the effectiveness of glycosylated Type IV pili as components as vaccines and how they compared to other types of vaccines for tuberculosis. Starting in 2012, she served as a grant application reviewer and panel chair at McMaster's Canadian Institutes of Health Research University Delegate. In March 2017, she was elected a Fellow of the American Academy of Microbiology. The following month, she was recognized with a McMaster University Faculty Association Award for Outstanding Service.

During the COVID-19 pandemic, Burrows published op-eds describing the danger of the coronavirus and encouraged Canadians to get vaccinated against the SARS-CoV-2 Omicron variant. In June 2020, she was honoured with the Canadian Society of Microbiologists Murray Award for Career Achievement, the Society's highest award for researchers. She used the accompanying prize money plus matching funds to establish The Burrows Award for Womxn in Microbiology which recognizes excellent microbiology trainees who contribute to diversity and equity efforts in their communities. The following year, she was elected a Fellow of the Canadian Academy of Health Sciences for her "outstanding research accomplishments, international leadership in the microbiology community and dedicated mentorship." in 2021 Burrows was appointed a Tier 1 Canada Research Chair in Microbe-Surface Interactions to fund her research on the superbug Pseudomonas aeruginosa and how it forms antibiotic-resistant biofilms. In March 2023, Burrows was named the recipient of the Canadian Association for Clinical Microbiology and Infectious Diseases' John G. FitzGerald Award for her research into Pseudomonas aeruginosa.
