= John Kelton (footballer) =

Australian rules footballer

Personal information
- Full name: John Kelton
- Born: 25 July 1937
- Died: 17 December 2012 (aged 75)
- Original team: Hampton Rovers
- Height: 189 cm (6 ft 2 in)
- Weight: 87 kg (192 lb)

Playing career^{1}
| Years | Club | Games (Goals) |
| 1957–60 | South Melbourne | 21 (4) |
- ^{1} Playing statistics correct to the end of 1960.

John Kelton (25 July 1937 – 17 December 2012) was an Australian rules footballer who played with South Melbourne in the Victorian Football League (VFL).
