= Philip Steven Wells =

Canadian hematologist

Philip Steven Wells is a Canadian hematologist and current chair and Chief of Medicine at the University of Ottawa and The Ottawa Hospital. He is considered an expert in thromboembolic disorders and is known for developing the Wells risk score for pulmonary embolism and deep vein thrombosis.

== Early life ==
Wells was born and raised in Kincardine, Ontario. An athletic student, he was highly active in his high school athletic team. In 1978, he attained Canadian National Junior Champion status as a high jumper.

== Education ==
Wells attended the University College, Toronto for his undergraduate degree in 1978. While there, he competed on the varsity track and field team and placed second in the Canadian Senior Track and Field Championships/1982 Commonwealth Games Trials meeting the Olympic standard of 2.18 metres that year.

Wells attended the University of Ottawa for medical school, graduating with his M.D. magna cum laude in 1984. During his time there, he was a member of the University of Ottawa varsity basketball team in 1982. He completed his internship at Ottawa Civic Hospital in 1985 and, after a year working as an Emergency Physician and doing Family Medicine locums, he completed his Internal Medicine residency at the University of Ottawa in 1989. He completed a fellowship in hematology at McMaster University Medical School in 1991 and completed a M.Sc. in Clinical Epidemiology at McMaster University in 1994.

== Career ==
In 1991, after completing his fellowship at McMaster University, he was appointed as an attending hematologist at Henderson General Hospital. In 1994, he moved back to the University of Ottawa becoming an assistant professor. In 1996, he was appointed Program Director for the Hematology Training program then he assumed the role of Chief and Chair of Hematology in 1998 and a Full Professor of Medicine with a cross appointment to Epidemiology and Community Medicine in 2003. In 2007, he was made the Deputy Head of Research in the Department of Medicine and in 2009, he was made the chair and Chief of Medicine at the University of Ottawa. From 2012 to 2015, he was the President of the Canadian Association for Professors of Medicine.

== Family ==
Wells is married and has two children, one studying medicine and the other studying to become a chiropractor.

== Awards ==
- University of Ottawa Lifetime Achievement Award - 2014
- The Ottawa Hospital J. David Grimes Career Achievement Award - 2012
- Canada Research Chair Award in Thromboembolic Diseases - July 2001 - June 2011
- Ottawa Health Research Institute, Dr Michel Chretien Researcher of the Year in 2009.
