= Casper (admissions test) =

Admissions test used by the McMaster University Medical School

Casper (Computer-Based Assessment for Sampling Personal Characteristics, earlier CASPer or "CMSENS") is an admissions test developed by Harold Reiter and Kelly Dore. It was made for McMaster University's Program for Educational Research and Development and has been used by the Michael G. DeGroote School of Medicine at McMaster since 2010. The test is intended to examine an applicant's soft skills such as empathy. As of 2025, the test is used as part of the admissions process in 12 Canadian medical schools.

Braden MacBeth from Science-Based Medicine has criticized Casper for its lack of transparency. MacBeth believes that it should not be used in the admissions process. The studies used to promote the test are considered to be poor scholarship by other independent academics. Most of the research supporting Casper was authored by people affiliated with the company that produces it. People hired to grade the test are not required to have any qualifications.
