= McMaster Faculty of Health Sciences =

Faculty of McMaster University in Hamilton, Ontario

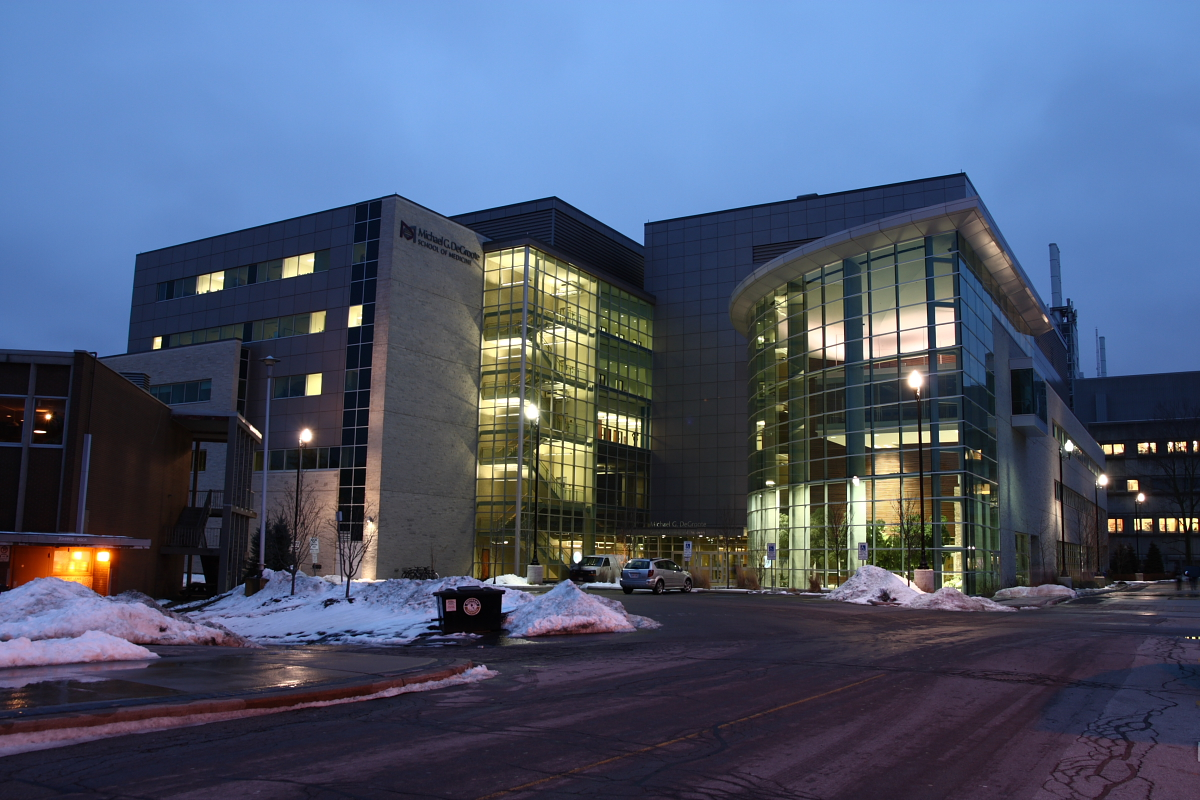
- Michael G. DeGroote Centre for Learning and Discovery
- Type: Public
- Established: 1974; 52 years ago
- Parent institution: McMaster University
- Vice-President: Paul O'Byrne
- Students: 5,000
- Location: Hamilton, Ontario, Canada
- Website: healthsci.mcmaster.ca

The McMaster Faculty of Health Sciences is one of six faculties of McMaster University in Hamilton, Ontario, Canada. The faculty was established in 1974 to oversee the School of Nursing, the School of Medicine, and Graduate programs in health sciences. Today, the Faculty of Health Sciences oversees 5,000 students, 770 full-time faculty, more than 1,800 part-time faculty, and 28 Canada Research Chairs.

The faculty is known for running the most competitive medical and undergraduate program in Canada. In 2023, the MD program at the Michael G. DeGroote School of Medicine received over 5,200 applications for 221 positions. The Honours Health Sciences Program at McMaster University receives over 8,000 applications for 260 positions annually and was ranked the most competitive undergraduate program in Canada by Master Student in 2022. The faculty was ranked 25th in the world in the 2015 Times Higher Education World Rankings in the Clinical, Pre-Clinical and Health category.

== Departments ==
The faculty currently houses the following departments:

- Anesthesia
- Biochemistry & Biomedical Sciences
- Health Research Methods, Evidence & Impact
- Family Medicine
- Medical Imaging
- Medicine
- Obstetrics & Gynecology
- Oncology
- Pathology & Molecular Medicine
- Pediatrics
- Psychiatry & Behavioural Neurosciences
- Surgery

== Programs ==
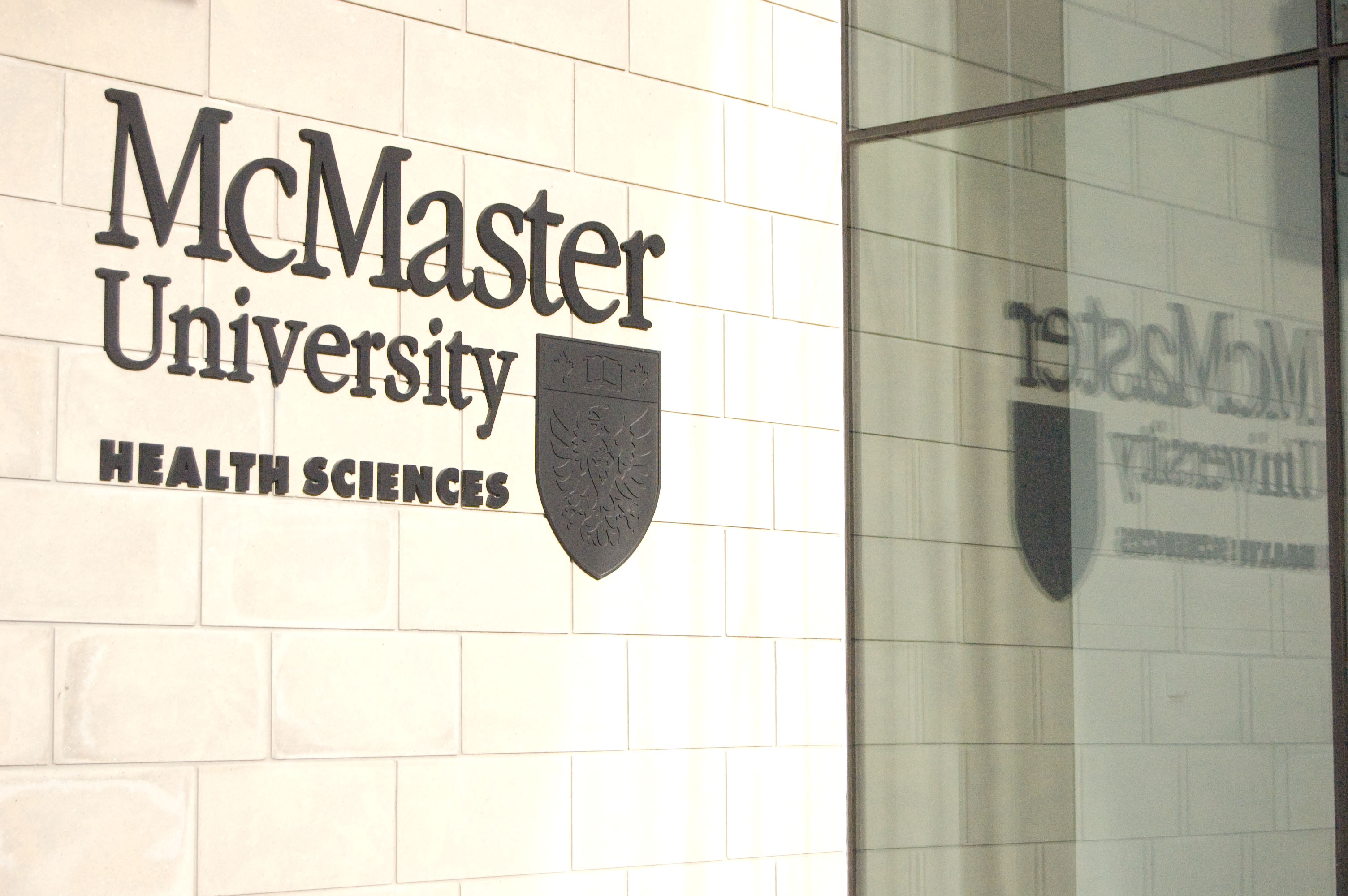

The faculty currently houses the following undergraduate programs:

- Honours Health Sciences Program (formerly Bachelor of Health Sciences (Honours) Program)
- Integrated Biomedical Engineering & Health Sciences
- Integrated Rehabilitation & Humanities
- Honours Biochemistry
- Biomedical Discovery & Commercialization Program
- Biology & Pharmacology Co-Op Program
- Midwifery Education Program
- Bachelor of Science Nursing Program
- Physician Assistant Education Program
- Undergraduate Medical Education Program

The faculty currently houses the following graduate programs:

- Research-oriented programs: Biochemistry, Biomedical Engineering (in collaboration with the Faculty of Engineering), Chemical Biology, eHealth (in collaboration with the Faculty of Engineering and the DeGroote School of Business), Global Health (in collaboration with the Faculty of Social Sciences and the DeGroote School of Business), Health Policy, Health Research Methodology, Health Science Education, Medical Sciences, Midwifery, Neuroscience (in collaboration with the Faculties of Science, Engineering, and Humanities), Nursing, Public Health, Rehabilitation Science
- Professional programs: Biomedical Discovery and Commercialization, Biomedical Innovation, Child Life & Pediatric Psychosocial Care, Health Management (in collaboration with the DeGroote School of Business), Occupational Therapy, Physiotherapy, Psychotherapy, Speech-Language Pathology
- Diploma programs: Astrobiology (in collaboration with the Faculty of Science), Clinical Behavioural Sciences, Clinical Epidemiology, Community and Public Health, Primary Health Care Nurse Practitioner, Water Without Borders (in collaboration with the United Nations University, Institute for Water, Environment and Health)

== Facilities ==
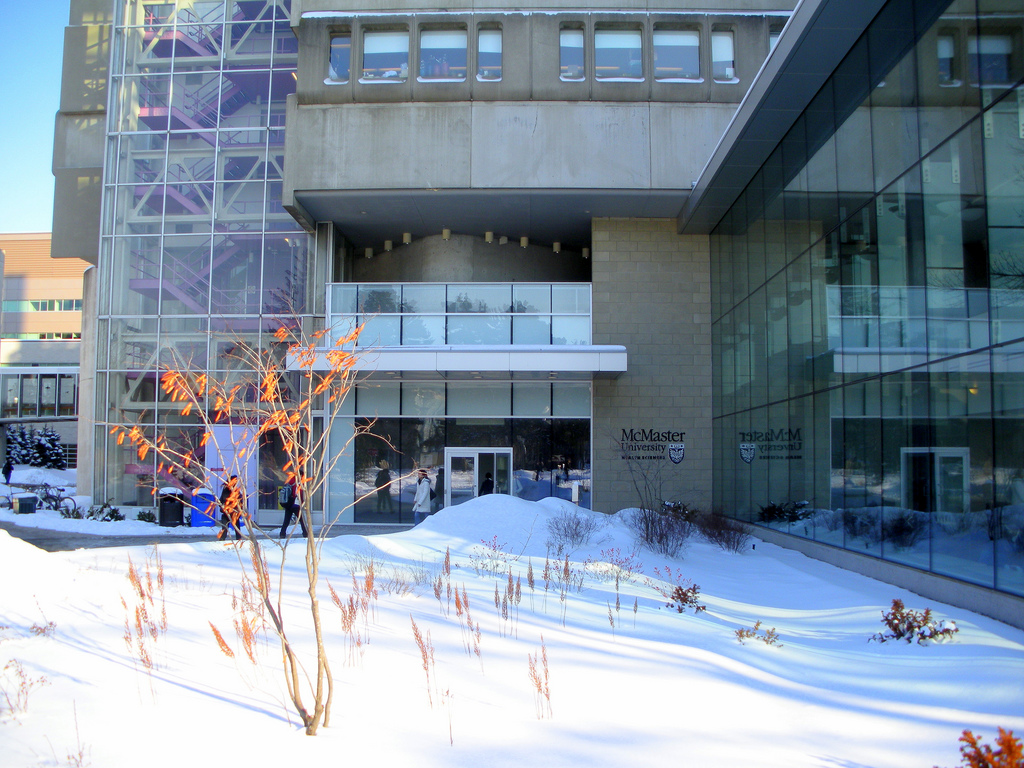
Health Sciences Library

The faculty currently operate a number of facilities on the McMaster's main campus and around Ontario for both education and research. The faculty also operates its own library at the university, known as the Health Sciences Library. The Michael G. DeGroote Centre for Learning and Discovery, which houses the faculty's medical school also houses more than 250 scientists and McMaster's medical institutes including, the Centre for Function Genomics, Centre for Gene Therapeutics, Institute for Cancer and Stem Cell Biology Research, Robert E. Fitzhenry Vector Laboratory, Centre for Asthma and Allergy Research (Allergen), the Michael G. DeGroote Institute for Pain Research and Care and North American Headquarters for West Nile studies.

The faculty also operate two regional campuses in St. Catharines, Ontario and Kitchener, Ontario. The campus in Kitchener, known as the Waterloo Regional Campus, shares facilities with the Health Sciences Campus of the University of Waterloo. The campus in St. Catharines is located at Brock University's Niagara Health and Bioscience Research Complex. Approximately 30 medical students in each year of the program attend each campus. Those who apply to McMaster's School of Medicine are asked to rank their site choice (Hamilton, Niagara Region, Waterloo Region) from first to third, or no preference. Offers of admission to the medical school are made from a rank list irrespective of geographical preference. Subsequent to filling the positions, registrants to the class are offered a position based on their preference and geographical background. The offers given out by McMaster are bound to the assigned site.

The faculty is also currently affiliated with two major academic hospital systems, Hamilton Health Sciences and St. Joseph's Healthcare Hamilton. Combined, the two faculties operate ten hospitals in the Hamilton area, each used as teaching hospital by the faculty. Norfolk General Hospital is the latest hospital to be affiliated with the faculty, becoming an affiliated teaching hospital with the university in 2009.

== Reputation ==
In the 2012 Times Higher Education rankings of clinical, pre-clinical, and health universities, the university ranked 16th in the world and 2nd in Canada, behind Mcgill University. The faculty was placed 82nd in the world and fourth in the country in the U.S. News & World Report university rankings for life sciences and biomedicine. In the field of clinical medicine and pharmacy, the ARWU in 2010 ranked the program 51st–75th in the world and third in Canada. In the 2016 Times Higher Education rankings of clinical, pre-clinical, and health universities, the university ranked 27th in the world, and 3rd in Canada, with the University of Toronto taking 1st in Canada and 11th in the world, whereas Mcgill University took 2nd in Canada and 20th in the world.

=== Research ===
In 2010, the university was ranked by High Impact Universities 25th out of 500 universities—second in the country—for research performance in the fields of medicine, dentistry, pharmacology, and health sciences. For five years in a row, McMaster has ranked second in Canada for biomedical and health care research revenues. In 2008–2009, Faculty investigators were overseeing $133 million a year in research, much of that research conducted by scientists and physicians who teach in the medical school. For its 2010 rankings, HEEACT ranked McMaster 26th in the world and second on a national scale for scientific papers in clinical medicine. The Faculty of Health Sciences operates several research institutes, including the Farncombe Family Digestive Health Research Institute, the Michael G. DeGroote Institute for Infectious Disease Research, and the Stem Cell and Cancer Research Institute. In November 2010, researchers at the Stem Cell and Cancer Research Institute turned clumps of human skin into blood cells, which may help alleviate the shortage of blood donors. A portion of Albert Einstein's brain is preserved and held for medical research at the McMaster brain bank. Researchers there have identified differences in his brain that may relate to his genius for spatial and mathematical thinking.
