= Richard Whitlock (surgeon) =

Canadian surgeon

- Education: McMaster University (BSc, MSc, PhD); University of Toronto (MD)
- Occupations: Cardiovascular surgeon and Intensivist
- Medical career
- Institutions: McMaster University; Population Health Research Institute
- Research: Cardiovascular surgery; Cardiac surgery; Anticoagulants

Richard Whitlock FRCSC is a Canadian cardiovascular surgeon and intensivist, the Canada Research Chair in Cardiovascular Surgery and a professor of surgery at McMaster University Medical School. He is most well known for being the principal investigator of the SIRS (Steroids in Cardiac Surgery) trial and the LAAOS III (Left Atrial Appendage Occlusion Study) trial. On April 9, 2015, Whitlock and his team performed the first transcatheter aortic valve implantation on a pregnant woman in the world.

== Education ==
Whitlock completed his B.Sc. in biochemistry at McMaster University in 1997 and his M.D. at the University of Toronto, graduating in 2001. He completed his residency in cardiac surgery at McMaster University Medical School in 2007 and followed up by completing a critical care fellowship in 2008 at the same institution. During residency, he completed his M.Sc. in health research methodology at McMaster University in 2004. He subsequently completed his Ph.D. in cardiac surgery at McMaster University in 2012.

== Career ==
Whitlock joined the Department of Cardiac Surgery at McMaster University as an assistant professor and staff cardiac surgeon and staff intensivist in 2008. He also became a P.I. at the Population Health Research Institute at the same time. In 2012, he was promoted to associate professor and in 2019, he was promoted to professor of surgery at McMaster University.

== Research ==
In 2012, Whitlock authored the 2012 American College of Chest Physicians guideline on antithrombotic and thrombolytic therapy for valvular disease. In 2015, Whitlock published the SIRS trial, the largest cardiovascular surgery trial in the world to date, which showed no benefit of corticosteroids in on-pump cardiac surgery. In 2021, Whitlock published the LAAOS III trial, a trial which showed left atrial appendage occlusion, a simple additional procedure during cardiac surgery, reduced stroke rates significantly in patients with baseline atrial fibrillation.

== Awards ==
- Ted Thomas Prize of McMaster University
- Award for Research and Education of the Anemia Institute
