= Ronald Germain =

Ronald Nathan Germain is a scientist at the National Institutes of Health (NIH). He was elected a Member of the National Academy of Sciences in 2016.

== Career ==
Germain studied medicine at Harvard University, receiving an MD and PhD in 1976. After several years on the faculty of Harvard Medical School, Germain took up a position as an immunologist at the US National Institute of Allergy and Infectious Diseases (NIAID) in 1982, where he became chief of the Laboratory of Systems Biology. Germain's work in the field of immunology has led to many awards and honors, including election as associate member of the European Molecular Biology Organization in 2008, and election to the US National Academy of Sciences in 2016.
