= Virtual patient =

Simulated patient used in health care education

The term virtual patient is used to describe interactive computer simulations used in health care education to train students on clinical processes such as making diagnoses and therapeutic decisions. Virtual patients attempt to combine modern technologies and game-based learning to facilitate education, and complement real clinical training. The use of virtual patients is increasing in healthcare due to increased demand for healthcare professionals and education of healthcare trainees, and provides learners with a safe practice environment. There are many formats from which a virtual patient may be chosen, but the overarching principle is that of interactivity. Virtual patients typically have mechanisms where information is parsed out in response to the learners, simulating how patients respond to different treatments. Interactivity can be created with questions, specific decision-making tasks, as well as text composition, and it is non-sequential. Most systems provide quantitative and qualitative feedback. In some cases, virtual patients are not full simulations themselves, but are mainly based on paper-based cases. This is because they do not allow for physical examination or an in-depth medical history of an actual patient. There are certain drawbacks, as crucial clinical findings may be missed due to the lack of examining patients in person.

== Forms ==
Virtual patients may take several different forms:

- Case Presentation: a review of patient-related cases to reinforce and apply primary medical concepts to real-world situations.
- Interactive Patient Scenario: multimedia patient case designed to teach clinical reasoning skills such as diagnostic test ordering and interpretation.
- Virtual Patient Game: interactive clinical scenarios that take place in an entirely virtual world designed to practice team training in high-risk situations (e.g. avatars within a virtual health facility).
- Virtual Reality Scenarios: virtual reality-based training exercises to teach procedural skills in situations of varying complexities. (e.g. virtual reality surgical simulation).
- High Fidelity Software Simulation: computer programs designed to allow the mimicking of human physiological conditions for a variety of clinical scenarios.
- High Fidelity Mannikin: realistic, programmable mannikins that can simulate a wide range of clinical scenarios; including simulating cardiac arrest, seizure, etc. complete with simulated, real-time vitals.
- Virtual Standardized Patient: an artificially intelligent patient designed with natural language capabilities to assist in training provider-patient communication skills.
- Virtual Clinical Trials: Virtual patients to simulate human and/or animal variability (e.g. virtpacient.sechenov.ru v-patients.com)

== Types of interactions ==
Several different modes of virtual patient delivery have been defined:

- Predetermined scenario [directed mode]
- The learner may build up the patient or case data from observations and interactions [blank mode]
- The learner may view and appraise or review an existing patient or scenario [critique mode or rehearsal mode]
- The VP may be used as a mechanism to address particular topics [context mode]
- The learner may use a scenario or patient to explore personal/professional dimensions [reflective mode]
- Banks of patients or scenarios may collectively address broad issues of healthcare [pattern mode]

== Possible benefits ==
Research has shown that utilizing virtual patients is time-efficient and cost-effective for developing clinical reasoning skills in students through independent and repeated practice of physician tasks in a safe environment without the risk of harm to the patient or learner, which can significantly increase the mental pool of learned cases in students. Unlike simulated or real patients, virtual patients can be accessed on demand, and the user may monitor a case over several months while spending less than an hour in real time. Furthermore, virtual patients can be endlessly replayed and easily modified to allow the user to explore different clinical scenarios and patient outcomes. Compared to simulated patients, virtual patients make observation and assessment more robust and easier to control, and they can be used as a standardized assessment method. Simulated patients can be viewed as educational tools that enhance existing methods of clinical teaching, making them more efficient and increasing the fairness of skill evaluation.

Over-reliance on hypothetical "average" models has been criticized for not teaching medical students to identify the significant amount of normal variation seen in the real world.

== Data standards ==
The MedBiquitous consortium established a working group in 2005 to create a free and open data standard for expressing and exchanging virtual patients between different authoring and delivery systems. This was in part to address the problem of exchanging and reusing virtual patients and in part to encourage and support easier and wider use of virtual patients in general.

This standard has been very successful and is now widely adopted, e.g. in major projects like eViP. In 2010, this standard attained status as an ANSI standard.
