= Norfolk General Hospital =

General hospital in Norfolk County, Ontario, Canada

- Location in Ontario

Geography
- Location: Simcoe, Norfolk County, Ontario, Canada
- Coordinates: 42.835°N 80.314°W

Organization
- Care system: Public Medicare (Canada) (OHIP)
- Type: General
- Affiliated university: McMaster University Faculty of Health Sciences

Services
- Emergency department: Yes
- Beds: 106

Helipads
- Helipad: TC LID: CPA8

History
- Founded: 1925

Links
- Website: www.ngh.on.ca
- Lists: Hospitals in Canada

Norfolk General Hospital is a general hospital in Simcoe, Ontario, Canada; it is the only one in Norfolk County. The hospital was founded in 1925. It became an official teaching site for McMaster University's Faculty of Health Sciences in 2009. Like many hospitals, it has a charitable foundation which helps to fund its capital acquisitions and various programs.

Norfolk General Hospital can support up to 3,719 patients; the average patient stay is nearly eight days. It takes about five hours for the average patient to be admitted to the emergency room. 13% of the beds are located in private rooms where people with private health insurance usually get them.

== Services ==
Norfolk General Hospital is equipped with 106 beds and a helipad. Recent improvements include expansion of the emergency department and installation of CT scan equipment. Doctors with hospital privileges include specialists and surgeons. The hospital also houses a nursing home for the elderly and the severely handicapped.

Recent economic problems have forced the hospital to close three beds, making some nursing jobs redundant. A lack of demand, attributed to more seniors staying at home, was also cited as a reason for the closure.

== Helipad ==
The hospital is not equipped with a helipad near their site. Air ambulances land at the helipad on Hunt Street North (next to Anvil) and then travel east on Queensway West, south on Queen Street South and then west along West Street. The helipad is maintained by the Government of Ontario.

== See also ==
- Abigail Becker, the Angel of Long Point
