= Simulated patient =

Person trained to act as a real patient

In health care, a simulated patient (SP), also known as a standardized patient, sample patient, or patient instructor, is an individual trained to act as a real patient in order to simulate a set of symptoms or problems. Simulated patients have been successfully utilized for education, evaluation of health care professionals, as well as basic, applied, and translational medical research.

The SP can also contribute to the development and improvement of healthcare protocols; especially in cases where input from the SP are based on extensive, first-hand experience and observations as a clinical patient undergoing care.

== History ==
Dr. Howard Barrows trained the first standardized patient in 1963 in University of Southern California. This SP simulated the history and examination findings of a paraplegic multiple sclerosis patient. Dr. Barrows also developed a checklist that the SP could use to evaluate the performance of the trainee. Dr. Paula Stillman trained another set of standardized patients in 1970 at the University of Arizona. Her pilot program had local actors portray the "mothers" of imaginary children. The actors would describe the illness the unseen child was suffering from, requiring the medical students taking the history to develop differential diagnoses based on the mother's testimony. In 1984, a number of residency programs in the northeastern U.S., gave their residents the same examination using SPs. The Medical Council of Canada was the first to use SPs in a licensure examination in 1993. The Educational Commission for Foreign Medical Graduates introduced the Clinical Skills Assessment exam in 1998 to test the clinical skills of foreign medical graduates. This exam is now the USMLE Step 2 Clinical Skills exam and is mandatory for obtaining medical licensure in the United States, for both foreign medical graduates and American medical students. Since 2004 SPs have been used to assess the clinical competencies of osteopathic medical school candidates in the COMLEX USA Level 2-Performance Evaluation.

== Uses ==
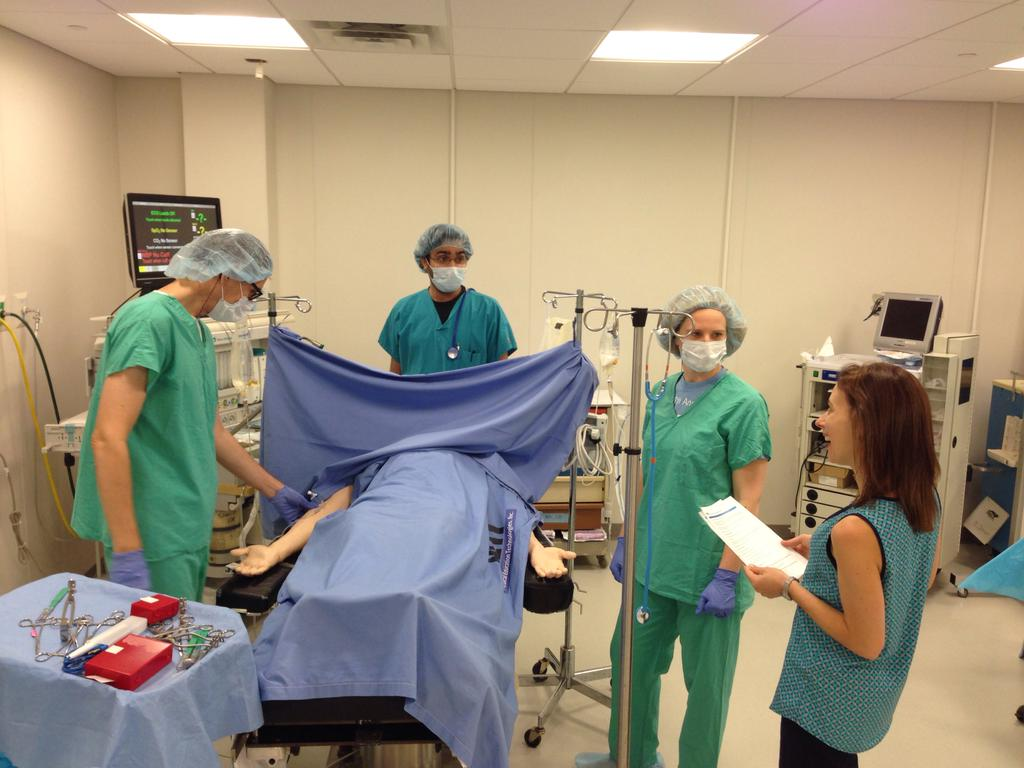
Photo of prebriefing for mixed modality simulation using two SP confederates as a nurse and surgeon for anesthesia resident training

Simulated patients (SP) are extensively used in medical and nursing education to allow students to practice and improve their clinical and conversational skills for an actual patient encounter. SPs commonly provide feedback after such encounters. They are also useful to train students to learn professional conduct in potentially embarrassing situations such as pelvic or breast exams. SPs who perform such training are given titles such as Gynecological Teaching Associate (GTA) or Urological Teaching Associate (UTA), as covered in more detail below. SPs are also used extensively in testing of clinical skills of students, usually as a part of an objective structured clinical examination. Typically, the SP will use a checklist to record the details of the encounter.

SPs have also been sent unannounced into a physician practices to evaluate the standards of care. They are also employed as field researchers on health informatics projects. They can also assist in the development of seminars and lectures in an academic setting, under the supervision of full or associate professors.

SPs can also serve as a "confederate" in a simulation to perform the roles of other clinicians within the care team. SPs used for in situ simulation activities may require special training.

For teaching future healthcare professionals how to perform intimate examinations, a specially trained simulated patient may be used. Intimate examinations include breast and pelvic examination on females and urogenital, prostate and rectal examination on males. Such roles are known by various names. One form of instruction is where a medical professional, a preceptor, teaches the medical student how to perform the examination using a simulated patient as the model.

For nursing, SPs are successfully supporting large cohorts of students in the undergraduate curricula.

== Advantages ==
The use of simulated patients has several advantages:

- Effectiveness: a SP with extensive clinical out-patient experience, would have first-hand knowledge and experience with the clinical out-patient environment, which should have an advantage over a professional actor who has to learn how to "play the part" of a clinical patient.
- Convenience: SPs are able to provide cases that are needed at the time they are needed. They are likely to be more reliable, and may tolerate more students than real patients.
- Standardization: The use of standardized clinical scenarios allows direct comparison of the students' clinical skills, locally as well as nationally and internationally.
- Compression/expansion of time: SPs can provide a longitudinal experience and enable students to follow through patients over time, even in a compressed time frame of examination. One technique employed in SP encounters is the use of information cards. When the trainee or examinee articulates the need for an examination or a laboratory test, the SP hands him/her a small card with the results of that exam/test, and the encounter can continue.
- Safety: SP encounters allow students to learn about situations they may not be able to manage alone in a real clinical setting, or where the use of a real patient may be inappropriate. For example, counseling a cancer patient.
- Efficiency: The monitoring of students by SPs reduces the need for supervision of medical students by physician faculty during clinical encounters.
- Repetition: Simulation allows students to repeat skills, and each time, the skill can increase in complexity.

== Limitations ==
The largest limitation of simulated patients use can be their cost.

At the same time, SPs are case specific and are able to assess clinical competency in a limited area only. Multiple encounters may be needed for broad ranged training or testing. Also, while SPs are quite proficient in simulating the symptoms, emotional states and even certain examination findings (neurological examination, for example), they may not be able to simulate certain other signs such as heart murmurs or lung sounds. Recruitment of SPs may also be difficult, time-consuming and more expensive than using 'real' patients.

== Recruitment ==
SPs need to draw on their own personal experiences with physicians, conversations with healthcare professionals, talking to specific patient populations etc. They also need to be trained to accurately and reliably simulate particular clinical scenarios. Frequent quality assessment may be needed to ensure consistency in the portrayal of the patient role; especially since SPs may absorb a significant amount of clinical knowledge from their interactions with healthcare professionals.

== See also ==
- Virtual patient
