= Siamon Gordon =

British pathologist

Siamon Gordon FRS FMedSci
- Born: 29 April 1938 (age 88)
- Education: University of Cape Town; Rockefeller University
- Scientific career
- Fields: Pathology
- Workplaces: University of Oxford
- Thesis: Nuclear and plasma membrane properties of macrophage heterokaryons and hybrids (1971)
- Doctoral students: Jonathan Austyn

Siamon Gordon (born 29 April 1938) is a British pathologist. He is Glaxo Wellcome Professor Emeritus of Cellular Pathology at the University of Oxford.

== Education ==
He gained his medical degrees (M.B. and Ch.B.) from the University of Cape Town, South Africa. He earned his PhD from Rockefeller University, where he taught from 1971 to 1976. The rest of his career, from 1976 to 2008, was at the University of Oxford.

== Career and research ==
He was on the Faculty of 1000. He was a visiting scientist at the NIH. He is on the Scientific Advisory Board of the American Asthma Foundation.

Gordon is noted for his work on the phenotypic and functional diversity of macrophages. He began his studies on macrophages while in the laboratory of Zanvil Cohn at Rockefeller University in 1966. Upon his move to the Sir William Dunn School of Pathology at University of Oxford in 1976 he continued this work and identified the pan-macrophage marker F4/80. Subsequent studies led to the identification of various scavenger receptors and the cloning of the pattern recognition receptor, Dectin-1.

He was elected a Fellow of the Academy of Medical Sciences in 2003 and of the Royal Society in 2007.

=== Publications ===
- Macrophage Biology and Activation, Current Topics in Microbiology and Immunology (ed, 1992)
- Siamon Gordon (ed) The Legacy of cell fusion Oxford University Press, 1994, ISBN 978-0-19-854772-3
- Advances in Cell and Molecular Biology of Membranes and Organelles (ed, 1999)
- Siamon Gordon, ed (1999). Phagocytosis: the host 5. JAI Press, ISBN 978-1-55938-999-0
- Siamon Gordon, ed. (2000). Phagocytosis: microbial invasion. Vol. 6. Elsevier. ISBN 978-0-7623-0610-7.
- Siamon Gordon, ed. (2003). The Macrophage as Therapeutic Target. Springer. ISBN 978-3-540-44250-9.
- Stefan H. E. Kaufmann; Ruslan Medzhitov; Siamon Gordon, eds. (2004). The innate immune response to infection. ASM Press. ISBN 978-1-55581-291-1.
