= List of hospitals in New Brunswick =

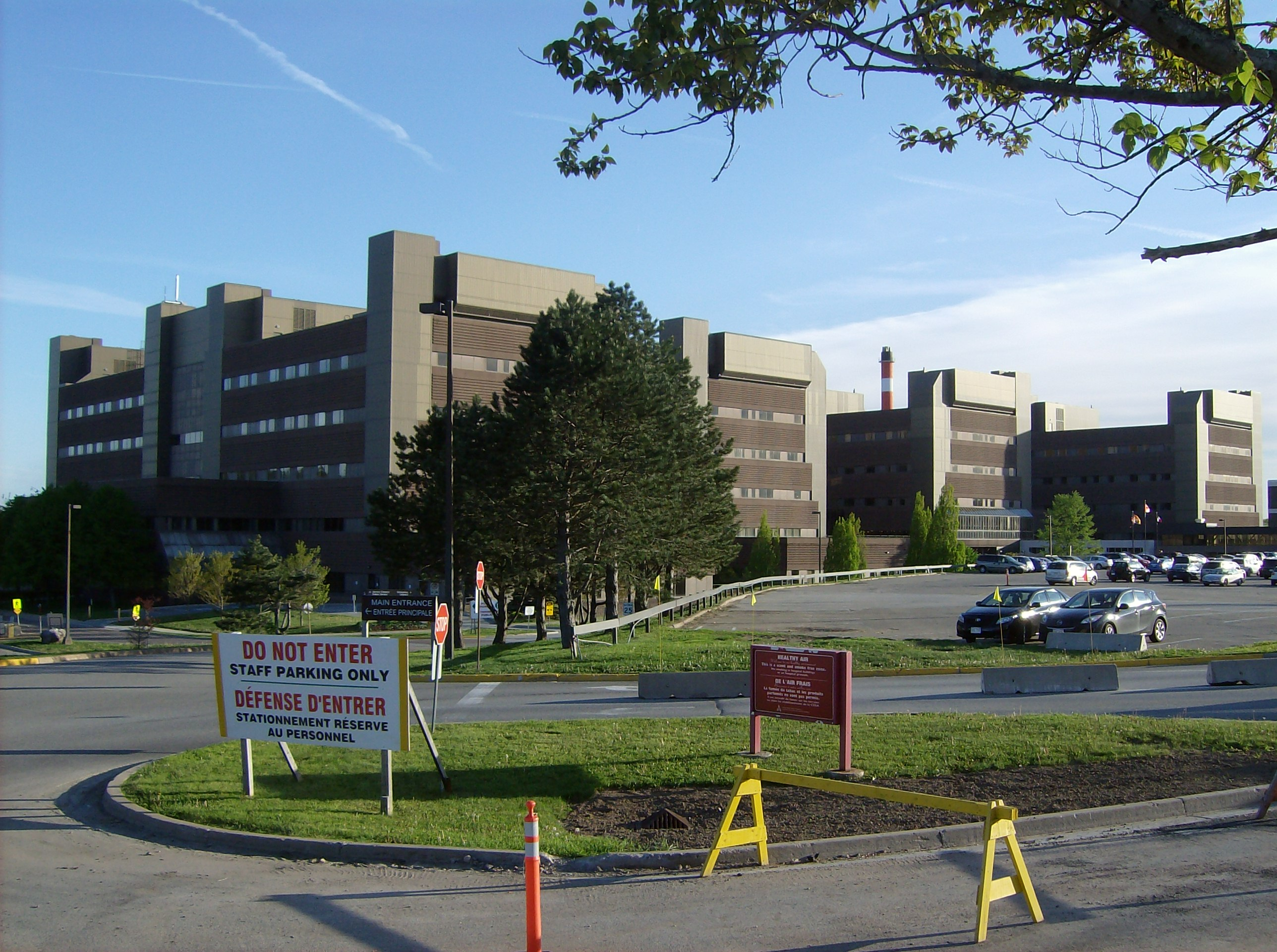
Saint John Regional Hospital, the largest tertiary care hospital in the province

The following are lists of current and former hospitals in the Canadian province of New Brunswick. All hospitals in New Brunswick use Ambulance New Brunswick and are provincially run by the Department of Health.

== Current hospitals ==
Hospital name	Type	Specialty	Community	Census Metropolitan Area	Primary service county	Secondary service county	Tertiary service county	Founded in community	Upgraded	Bed count	Operated by	Notes
Chaleur Regional	General		Bathurst		Gloucester	Northumberland	Restigouche				Vitalité	
Campbellton Regional	General		Campbellton	Gaspé Peninsula	Restigouche	Gaspésie–Îles-de-la-Madeleine	Northumberland				Vitalité	
Restigouche Hospital	Psychiatric		Campbellton	Northern New Brunswick	Restigouche	Gaspésie–Îles-de-la-Madeleine	Northumberland				Vitalité	
l'Enfant-Jésus	General		Caraquet		Gloucester	Northumberland	Restigouche				Vitalité	
Edmundston Regional	General		Edmundston		Madawaska	Restigouche	Témiscouata				Vitalité	
Dr. Everett Chalmers Regional	General	Reconstructive/ plastic surgery	Fredericton	Greater Fredericton	York	Sunbury	Queens	1976		315	Horizon	
Grand Falls General	General		Grand Falls		Victoria	Madawaska	Aroostook				Vitalité	
Grand Manan Hospital	General		Grand Manan		Charlotte	Saint John	Kings				Horizon	
Miramichi Regional	General		Miramichi		Northumberland	Gloucester	Kent				Horizon	
Dr. Georges-L.-Dumont	General	Oncology	Moncton	Greater Moncton	Westmorland	Albert	Kent	1922		423	Vitalité	
Moncton	General	Neurosurgery	Moncton	Greater Moncton	Westmorland	Albert	Kent	1895		400	Horizon	
Oromocto Public	General		Oromocto	Greater Fredericton	Sunbury	Queens	York				Horizon	
Hotel-Dieu of St. Joseph	General		Southern Victoria		Victoria	Carleton	Aroostook				Horizon	
Sackville Memorial	General	Secondary care	Sackville		Westmorland	Kent	Cumberland			21	Horizon	
Centracare	Psychiatric		Saint John	Southern New Brunswick	Saint John	Charlotte	Kings	1835		50	Horizon	
Saint John Regional	General	Cardiac	Saint John	Greater Saint John	Saint John	Kings	Charlotte	1982		524	Horizon	
St. Joseph's Hospital	General		Saint John	Greater Saint John	Saint John	Kings	Charlotte				Horizon	
Stella-Maris-De-Kent Hospital	General		Sainte-Anne-de-Kent		Kent	Northumberland	Westmorland				Vitalité	
Hôtel-Dieu Saint-Joseph	General		Saint-Quentin		Restigouche	Victoria	Madawaska				Vitalité	
Charlotte County Hospital	General		St. Stephen		Charlotte	Washington	York				Horizon	
Sussex Health Centre	General		Sussex		Kings	Saint John	Queens				Horizon	
Tracadie-Sheila Hospital	General		Tracadie-Sheila		Gloucester	Northumberland	Restigouche				Vitalité	
Upper River Valley Hospital	General		Waterville		Carleton	York	Victoria			70	Horizon	

== Former hospitals ==
Hospital name	Municipality	Census Metropolitan Area	Year open	Year closed	Last bed count	Fate of hospital
Saint John General Hospital	Saint John		1931	c. 1985		Demolished in 1995
Saint John Public Hospital	Saint John		1865	c. 1930		

== See also ==
- List of hospitals in Canada
- Government of New Brunswick - List of regional services by Health Region
