= List of hospitals in Canada =

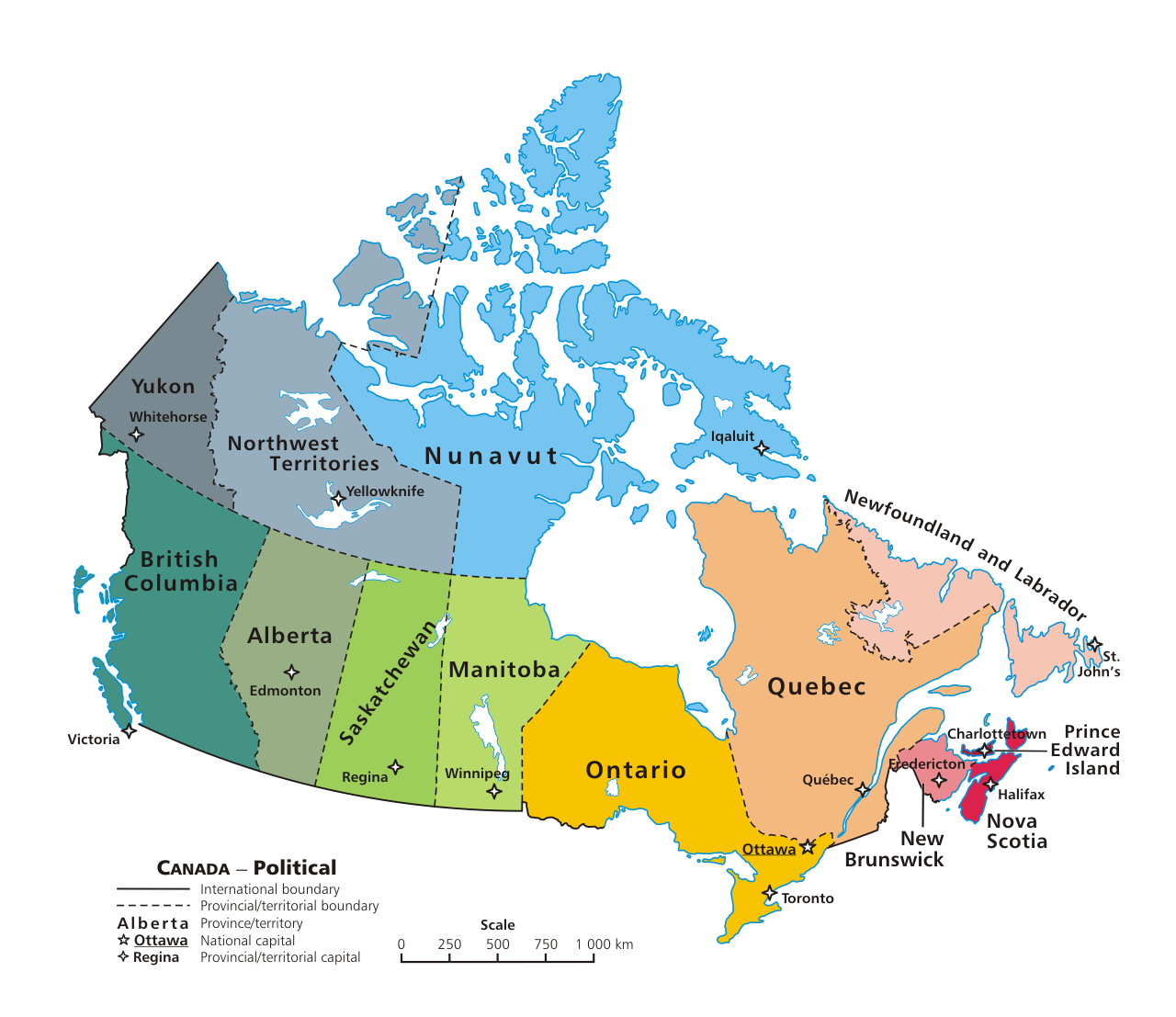
Provinces of Canada

This is a list of hospitals in Canada.

== Alberta ==
For a list sorted by facility name see List of hospitals in Alberta

- Banff
  - Banff Mineral Springs Hospital
- Bassano
  - Bassano Health Centre
- Calgary
  - Alberta Children's Hospital (ACH)
  - Arthur J.E. Child Comprehensive Cancer Centre (ACCC)
  - Foothills Medical Centre (FMC)
  - Peter Lougheed Centre (PLC)
  - Rockyview General Hospital (RGH)
  - Sheldon M. Chumir Centre
  - South Health Campus (SHC)
- Canmore
  - Canmore General Hospital
- Edmonton
  - Alberta Hospital Edmonton
  - Cross Cancer Institute
  - Devon General Hospital
  - Glenrose Rehabilitation Hospital
  - Grey Nuns Community Hospital & Health Centre
  - Leduc Community Hospital & Health Centre
  - Misericordia Community Hospital
  - Northeast Community Health Centre
  - Royal Alexandra Hospital
  - University of Alberta Hospital
    - Stollery Children's Hospital
- Lethbridge
  - Chinook Regional Hospital
- Lloydminster
  - Lloydminster Hospital (in Saskatchewan)
- Medicine Hat
  - Medicine Hat Regional Hospital
- Milk River
  - Milk River Health Centre
- Stony Plain
  - WestView Health Centre
- Vulcan
  - Vulcan Community Health Centre
- Whitecourt
  - Whitecourt Healthcare Centre

== British Columbia ==
For a list sorted by facility name see List of hospitals in British Columbia

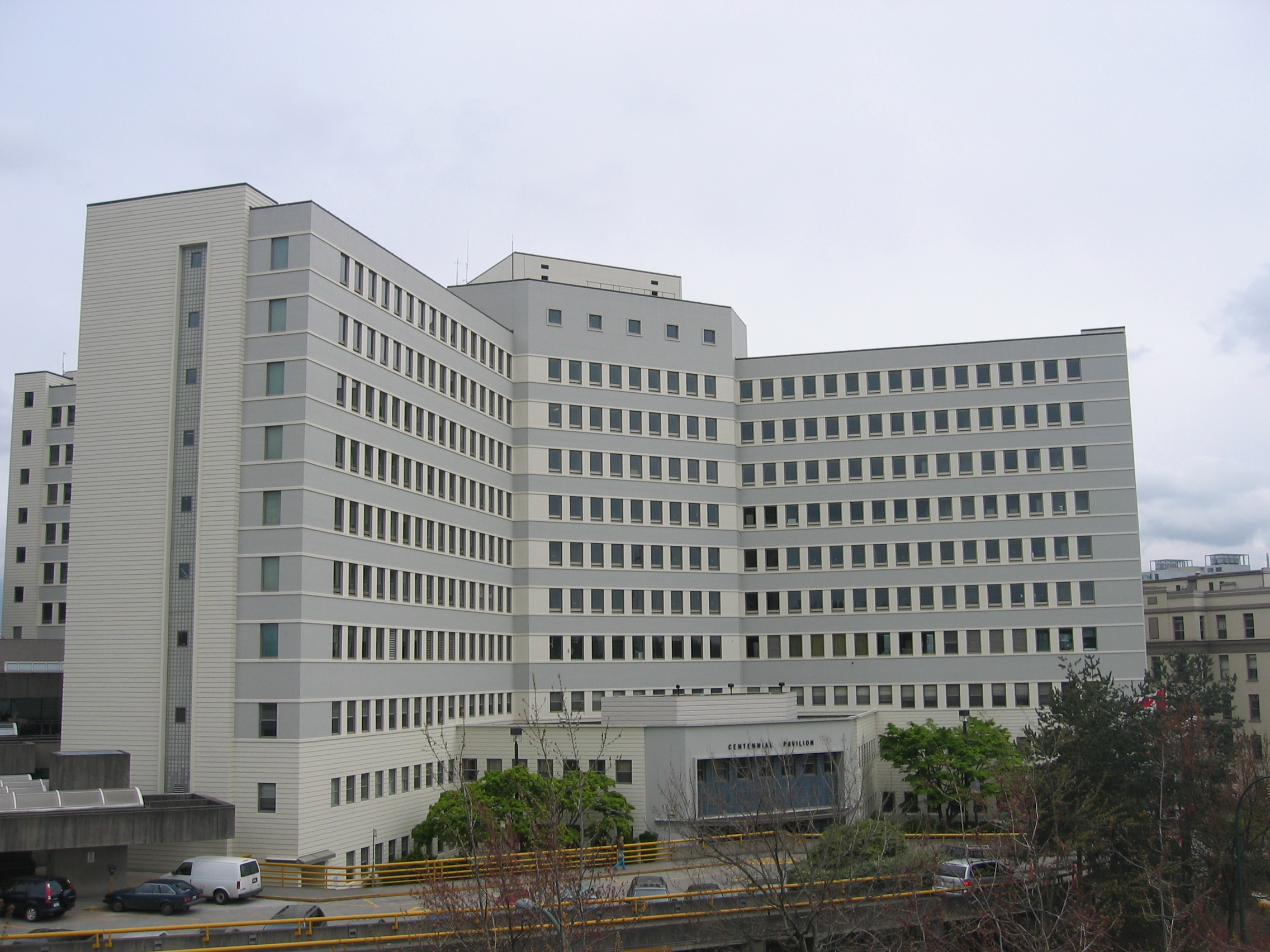
Vancouver General Hospital Centennial Pavilion

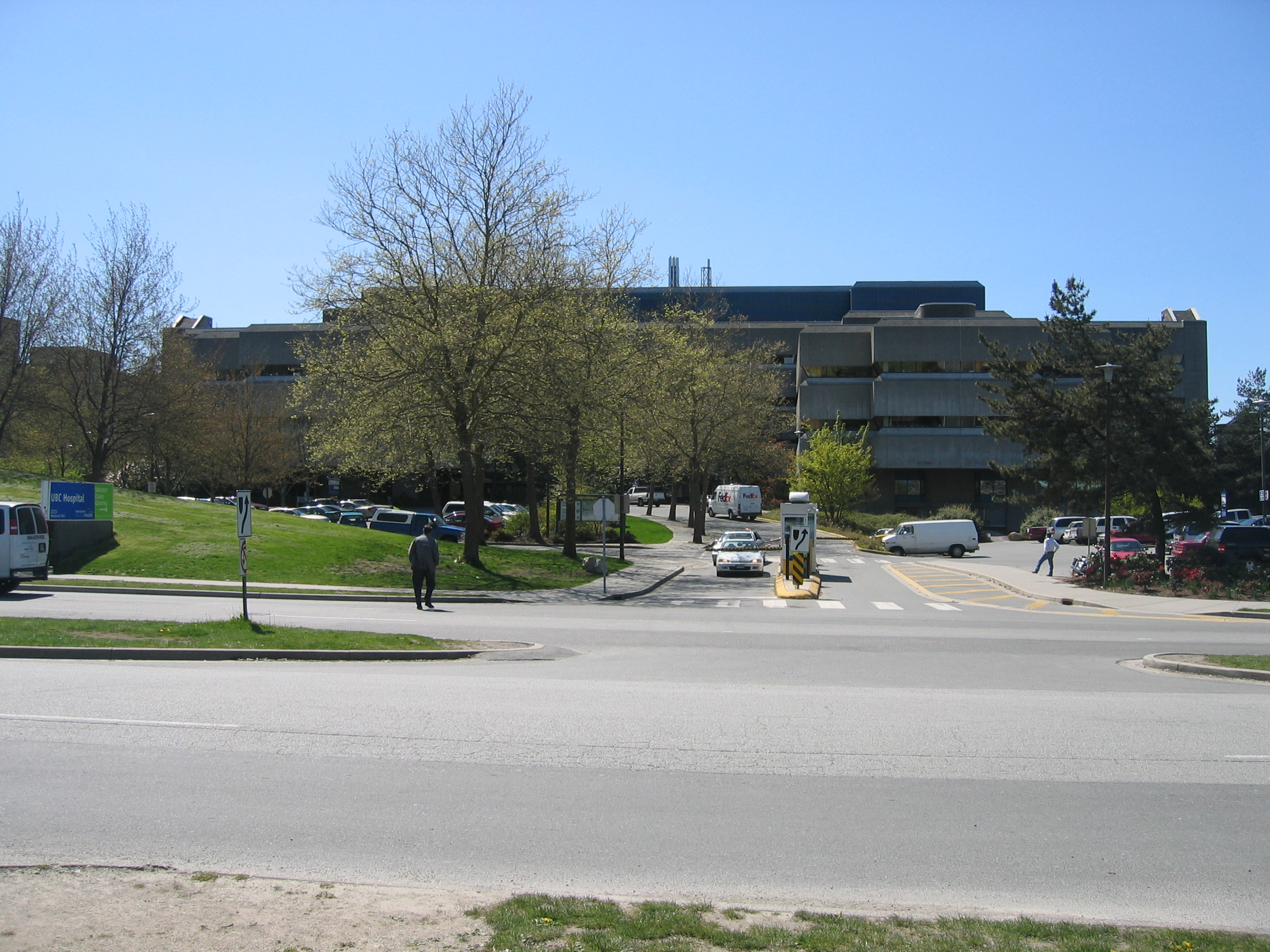
UBC Hospital

- Abbotsford
  - Abbotsford Regional Hospital and Cancer Centre
- Burnaby
  - Burnaby Hospital
- Chilliwack
  - Chilliwack General Hospital
- Coquitlam
  - Riverview Hospital
- Delta
  - Delta Hospital
- Hope
  - Fraser Canyon Hospital
- Kamloops
  - Royal Inland Hospital
- Kelowna
  - Kelowna General Hospital
- Langley
  - Langley Memorial Hospital
- Maple Ridge
  - Ridge Meadows Hospital
- Mission
  - Mission Memorial Hospital
- Nanaimo
  - Nanaimo Regional General Hospital
- New Westminster
  - Royal Columbian Hospital
- North Vancouver
  - Lions Gate Hospital
- Oliver
  - South Okanagan General Hospital
- Parksville
- Port Moody
  - Eagle Ridge Hospital
- Richmond
  - Richmond Hospital (RGH)
- Saanich
  - Saanich Peninsula Hospital
- Surrey
  - Surrey Memorial Hospital
- Terrace
  - Mills Memorial Hospital
- Vancouver
  - BC Cancer Agency
  - British Columbia's Children's Hospital & Sunny Hill Health Centre for Children
  - B.C. Women's Hospital & Health Centre
  - G. F. Strong Centre
  - Mary Pack Arthritis Centre
  - Mount Saint Joseph Hospital
  - St. Paul's Hospital
  - Vancouver Hospital and Health Sciences Centre
    - Vancouver General Hospital
- Vernon
  - Vernon Jubilee Hospital
- Victoria
  - Royal Jubilee Hospital
  - Victoria General Hospital
- White Rock
  - Peace Arch Hospital

== Manitoba ==
- Brandon
  - Brandon Regional Health Centre
- Steinbach
  - Bethesda Hospital
- Portage la Prairie
  - Portage District General Hospital
- Winnipeg
  - Concordia Hospital
  - Deer Lodge Centre
  - Grace Hospital
  - Health Sciences Centre
    - HSC Winnipeg Children's Hospital
    - Winnipeg General Hospital
  - Misericordia Health Centre
  - Riverview Health Centre
  - Saint Boniface General Hospital
  - Seven Oaks General Hospital
  - Victoria General Hospital

== New Brunswick ==
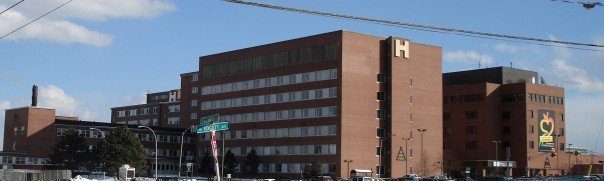
The Moncton Hospital, Moncton

Hospitals of New Brunswick
Hospital name	Type	Specialty	Community	Census Metropolitan Area	Primary service county	Secondary service county	Tertiary service county	Founded in community	Upgraded	Bed count	Operated by	Notes
Chaleur Regional	General		Bathurst		Gloucester	Northumberland	Restigouche				Vitalité	
Campbellton Regional	General		Campbellton	Gaspé Peninsula	Restigouche	Gaspésie–Îles-de-la-Madeleine	Northumberland				Vitalité	
Restigouche Hospital	Psychiatric		Campbellton	Northern New Brunswick	Restigouche	Gaspésie–Îles-de-la-Madeleine	Northumberland				Vitalité	
l'Enfant-Jésus	General		Caraquet		Gloucester	Northumberland	Restigouche				Vitalité	
Edmundston Regional	General		Edmundston		Madawaska	Restigouche	Témiscouata				Vitalité	
Dr. Everett Chalmers Regional	General	Reconstructive/ plastic surgery	Fredericton	Greater Fredericton	York	Sunbury	Queens	1976		315	Horizon	
Grand Falls General	General		Grand Falls		Victoria	Madawaska	Aroostook				Vitalité	
Grand Manan Hospital	General		Grand Manan		Charlotte	Saint John	Kings				Horizon	
Miramichi Regional	General		Miramichi		Northumberland	Gloucester	Kent				Horizon	
Dr. Georges-L.-Dumont	General	Oncology	Moncton	Greater Moncton	Westmorland	Albert	Kent	1922		423	Vitalité	
Moncton	General	Neurosurgery	Moncton	Greater Moncton	Westmorland	Albert	Kent	1895		400	Horizon	
Oromocto Public	General		Oromocto	Greater Fredericton	Sunbury	Queens	York				Horizon	
Hotel-Dieu of St. Joseph	General		Southern Victoria		Victoria	Carleton	Aroostook				Horizon	
Sackville Memorial	General	Secondary care	Sackville		Westmorland	Kent	Cumberland			21	Horizon	
Centracare	Psychiatric		Saint John	Southern New Brunswick	Saint John	Charlotte	Kings	1835		50	Horizon	
Saint John Regional	General	Cardiac	Saint John	Greater Saint John	Saint John	Kings	Charlotte	1982		524	Horizon	
St. Joseph's Hospital	General		Saint John	Greater Saint John	Saint John	Kings	Charlotte				Horizon	
Stella-Maris-De-Kent Hospital	General		Sainte-Anne-de-Kent		Kent	Northumberland	Westmorland				Vitalité	
Hôtel-Dieu Saint-Joseph	General		Saint-Quentin		Restigouche	Victoria	Madawaska				Vitalité	
Charlotte County Hospital	General		St. Stephen		Charlotte	Washington	York				Horizon	
Sussex Health Centre	General		Sussex		Kings	Saint John	Queens				Horizon	
Tracadie-Sheila Hospital	General		Tracadie-Sheila		Gloucester	Northumberland	Restigouche				Vitalité	
Upper River Valley Hospital	General		Waterville		Carleton	York	Victoria			70	Horizon	

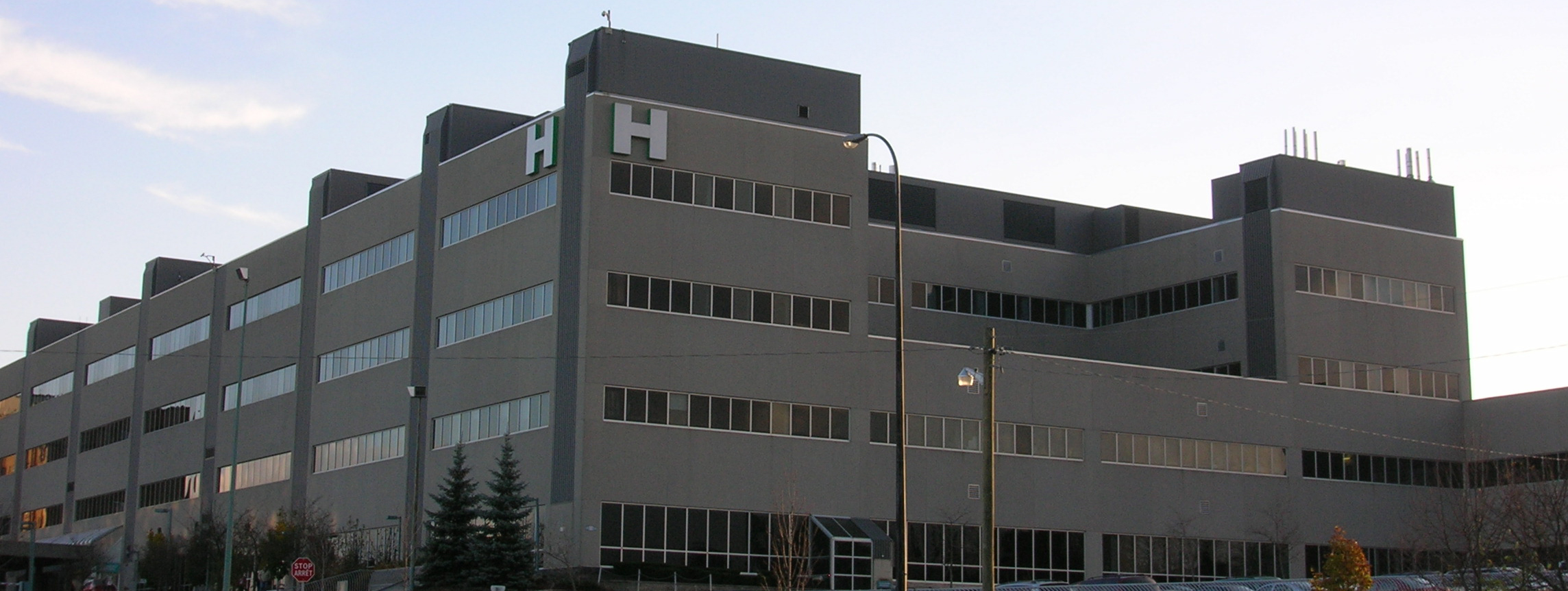
The Dr. Georges-L.-Dumont University Hospital Centre, Moncton

== Newfoundland and Labrador ==
Hospitals in Newfoundland and Labrador are operated by Newfoundland and Labrador Health Services.

Facilities listed as Hospitals and Health by NL Health Services:

- Carbonear
  - Carbonear General Hospital
- Clarenville
  - Dr. G.B. Cross Memorial Hospital
- Corner Brook
  - Western Memorial Regional Hospital
- Gander
  - James Paton Memorial Regional Health Centre
- Grand Falls-Windsor
  - Central Newfoundland Regional Health Centre
- Happy Valley-Goose Bay
  - Labrador Health Centre
- Labrador City
  - Labrador West Health Centre
- St. John's
  - Health Sciences Centre
    - Dr H. Bliss Murphy Cancer Centre
    - General Hospital (locally referred to as the Health Sciences Centre)
    - Janeway Children's Health and Rehabilitation Centre
    - Mental Health and Addictions Centre
    - Nuclear and Molecular Medicine Facility
  - St. Clare’s Mercy Hospital
  - Waterford Hospital
- Stephenville
  - Sir Thomas Roddick Hospital

Additionally, a number of facilities across the province are labelled as "Health Centre," including many which either contain Hospital in their name or are known as the town's hospital. 49 of the 58 facilities currently listed as Hospitals and Health Centres have Emergency Rooms.

== Northwest Territories ==
- Hay River Regional Health Centre
- Inuvik Regional Hospital
- Stanton Territorial Hospital

== Nova Scotia ==
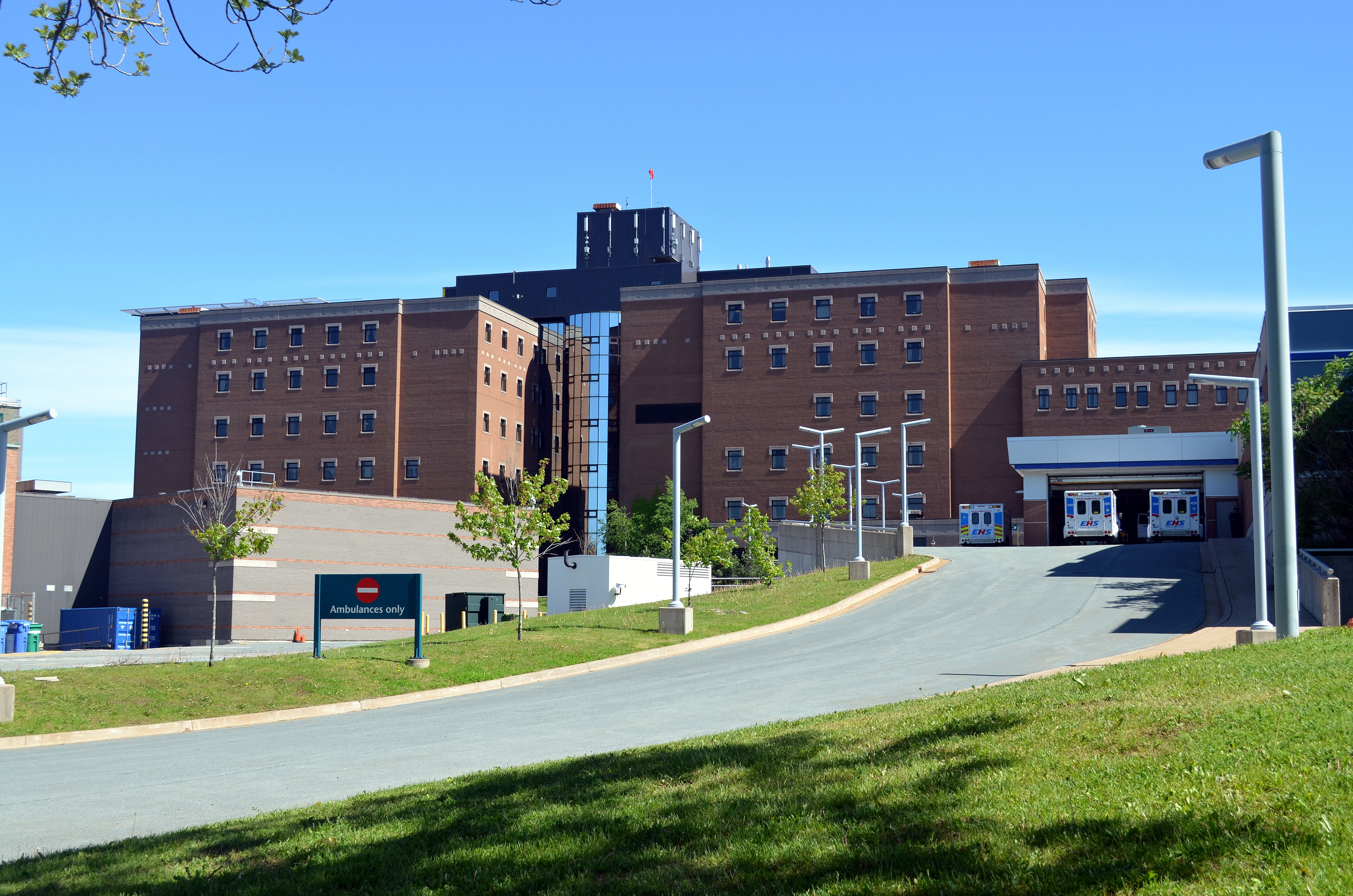
QEII Health Sciences Centre, Halifax

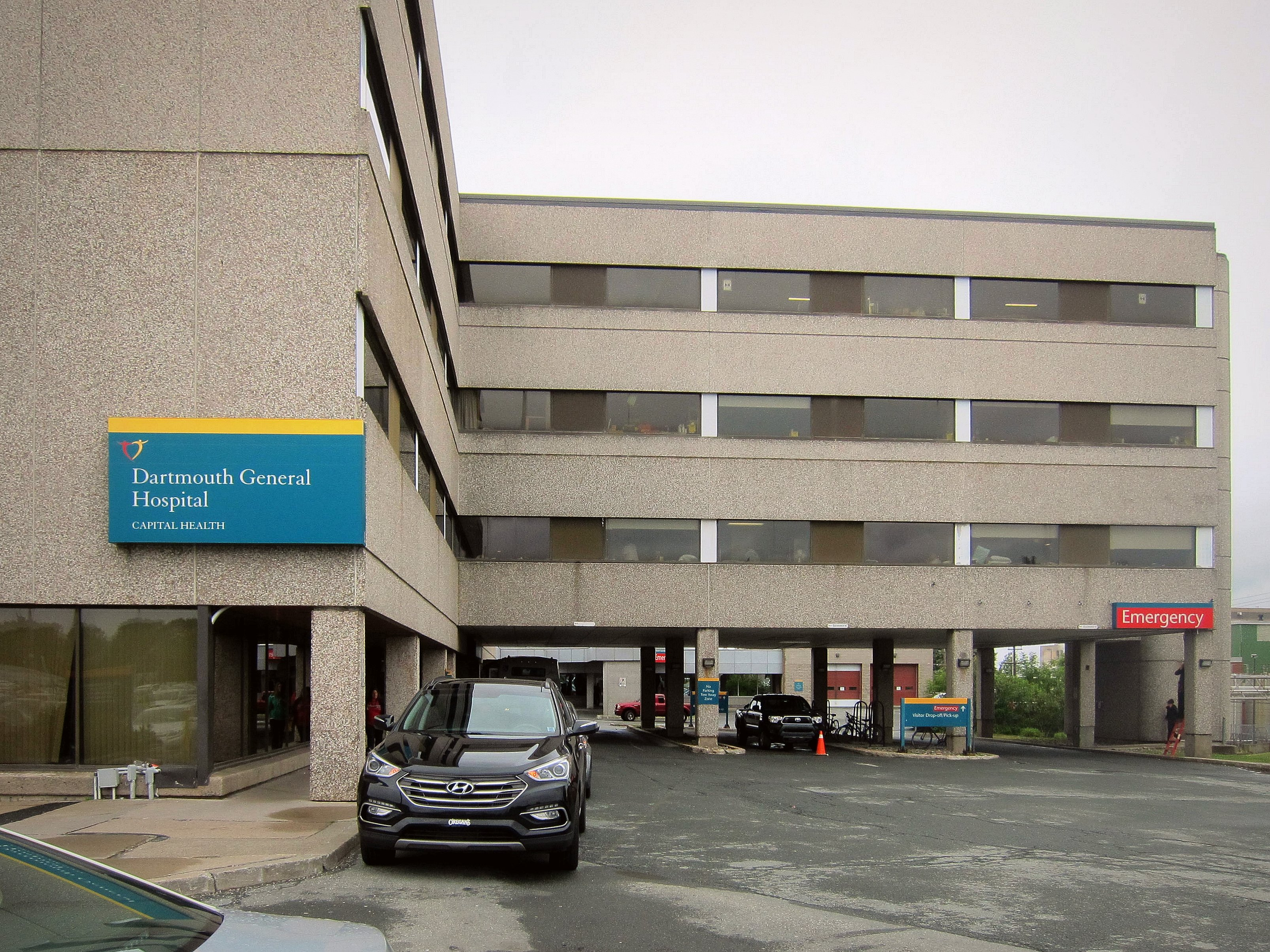
Dartmouth General Hospital

- Antigonish
  - St. Martha's Regional Hospital
- Canso
  - Eastern Memorial Hospital
- Cumberland County
  - Cumberland Regional Health Care Centre, Upper Nappan
- Digby
  - Digby General Hospital
- Glace Bay
  - Glace Bay Hospital
- Guysborough
  - Guysborough Memorial Hospital
- Halifax Regional Municipality
  - Dartmouth
    - Dartmouth General Hospital
    - East Coast Forensic Hospital
    - Nova Scotia Hospital
  - Halifax Peninsula
    - IWK Health Centre
    - Queen Elizabeth II Health Sciences Centre
  - Middle Musquodoboit
    - Musquodoboit Valley Memorial Hospital
  - Musquodoboit Harbour
    - Twin Oaks Memorial Hospital
- Hants County
  - Hants Community Hospital
- Inverness
  - Inverness Consolidated Memorial Hospital
- Kentville
  - Valley Regional Hospital
- Lunenburg
  - Fishermen's Memorial Hospital
- Middleton
  - Soldiers Memorial Hospital
- New Glasgow
  - Aberdeen Hospital
- Sheet Harbour
  - Eastern Shore Memorial Hospital
- Springhill
  - All Saints Springhill Hospital
- Sydney
  - Cape Breton Regional Hospital
- Sydney Mines
  - Harbourview Hospital
- Tatamagouche
  - Lillian Fraser Memorial Hospital
- Yarmouth
  - Yarmouth Regional Hospital

== Nunavut ==
- Iqaluit
  - Qikiqtani General Hospital

== Ontario ==
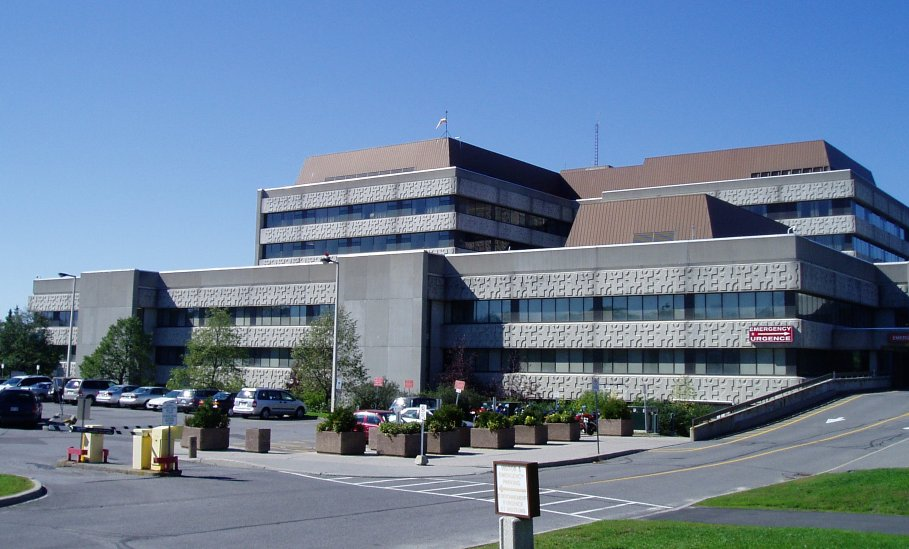
Children's Hospital of Eastern Ontario

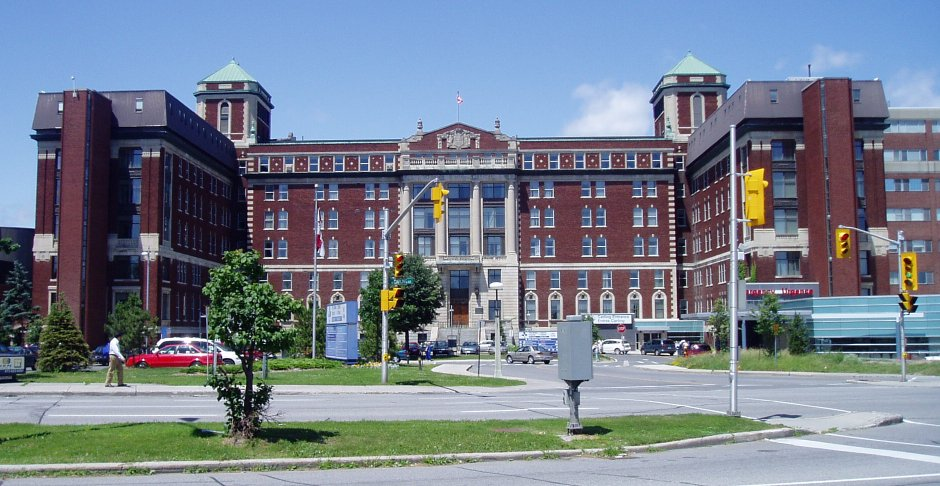
Ottawa Civic Hospital

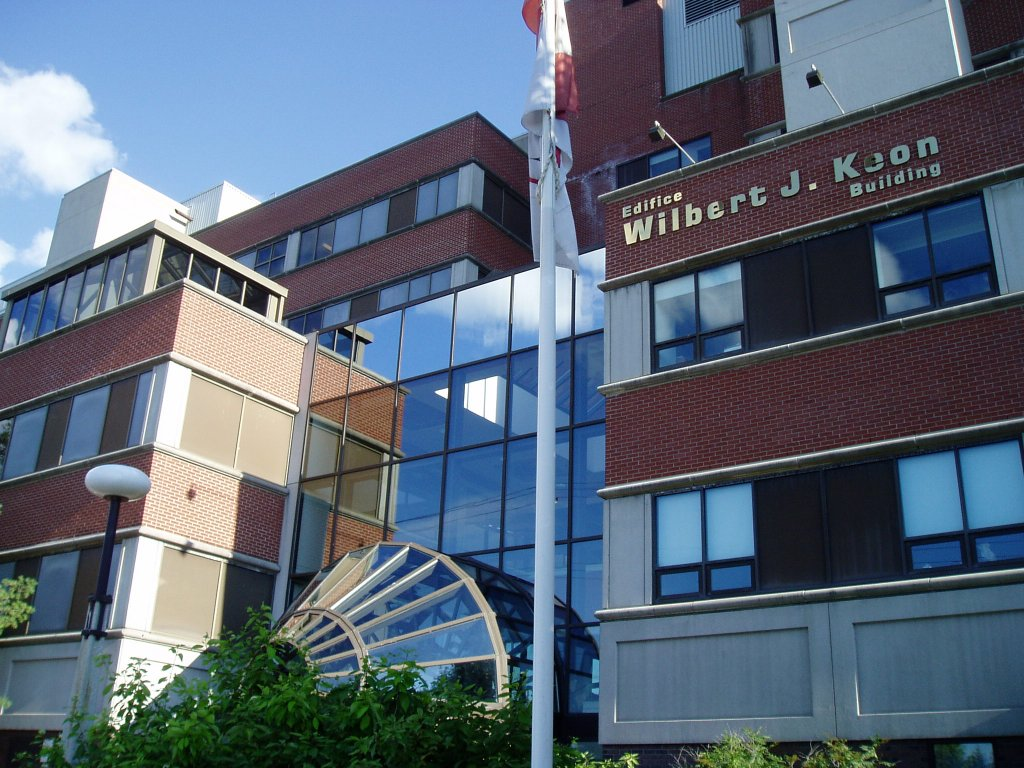
University of Ottawa Heart Institute

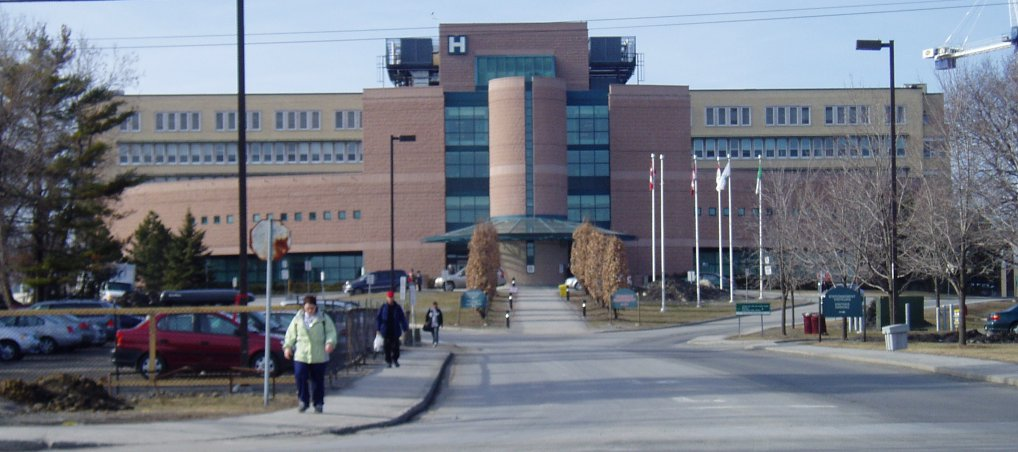
Ottawa's French language Montfort Hospital

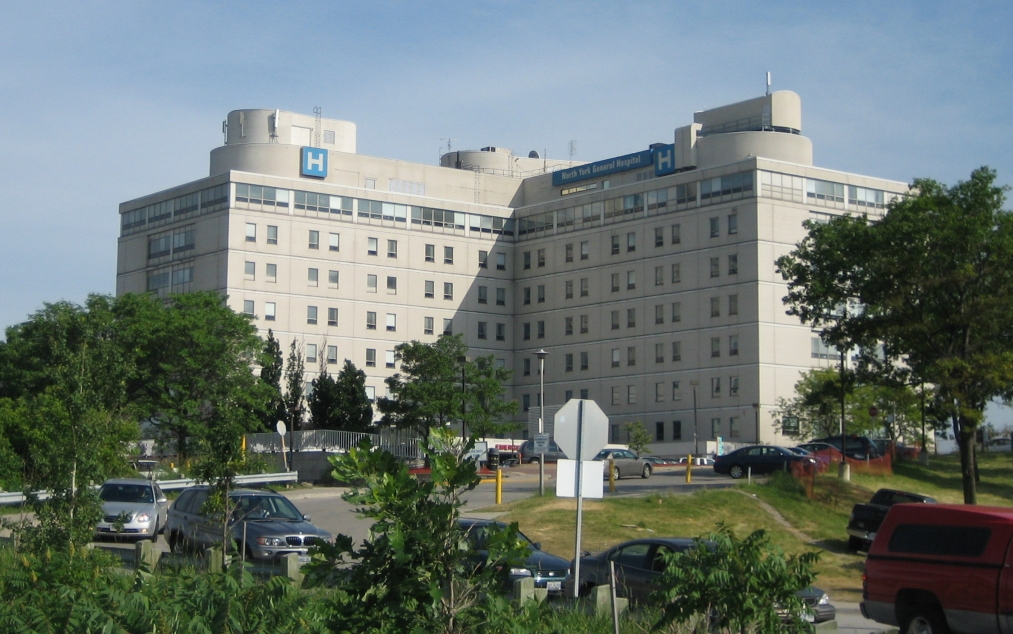
North York General Hospital

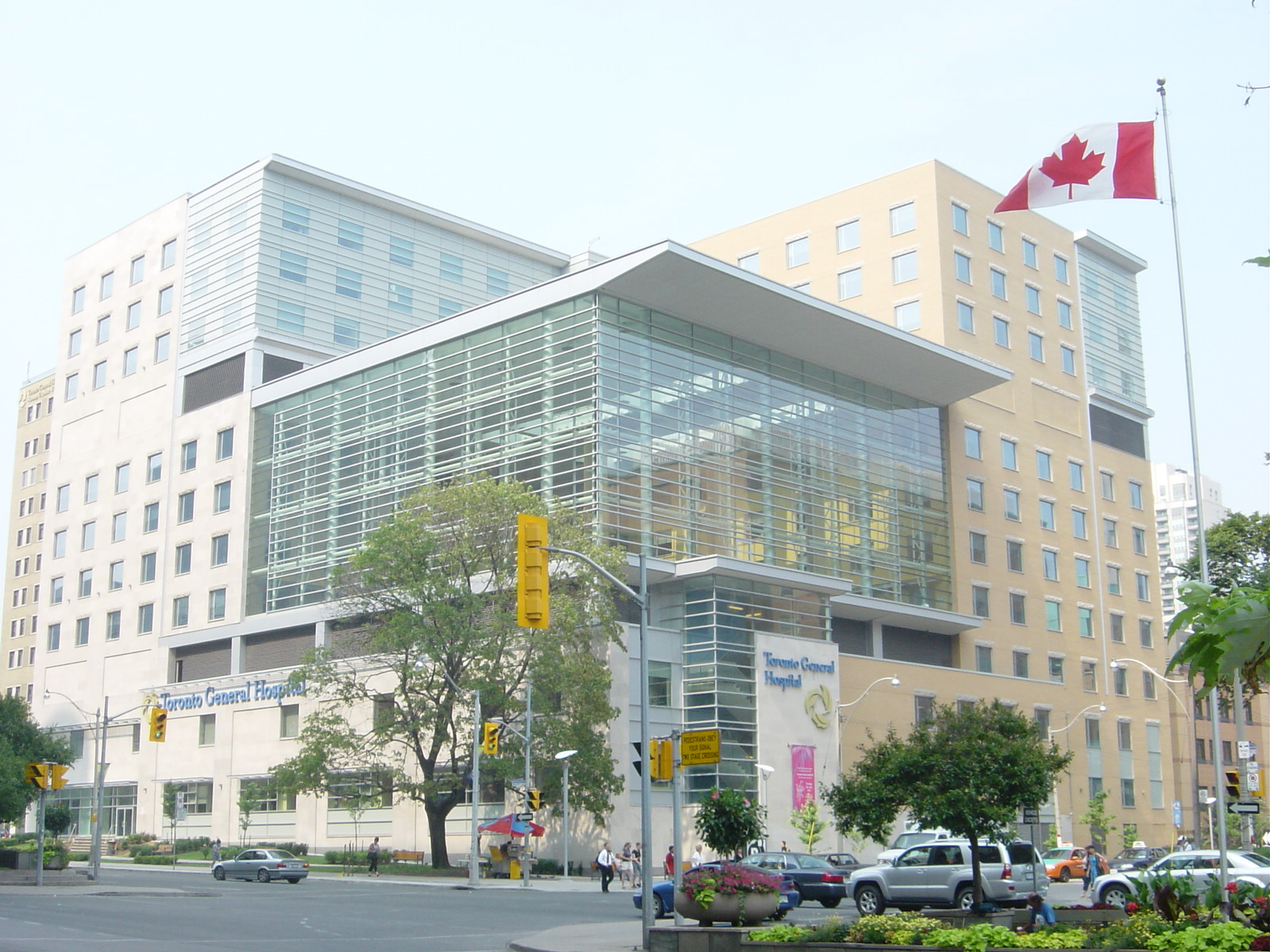
Toronto General Hospital, R.R. McEwen atrium

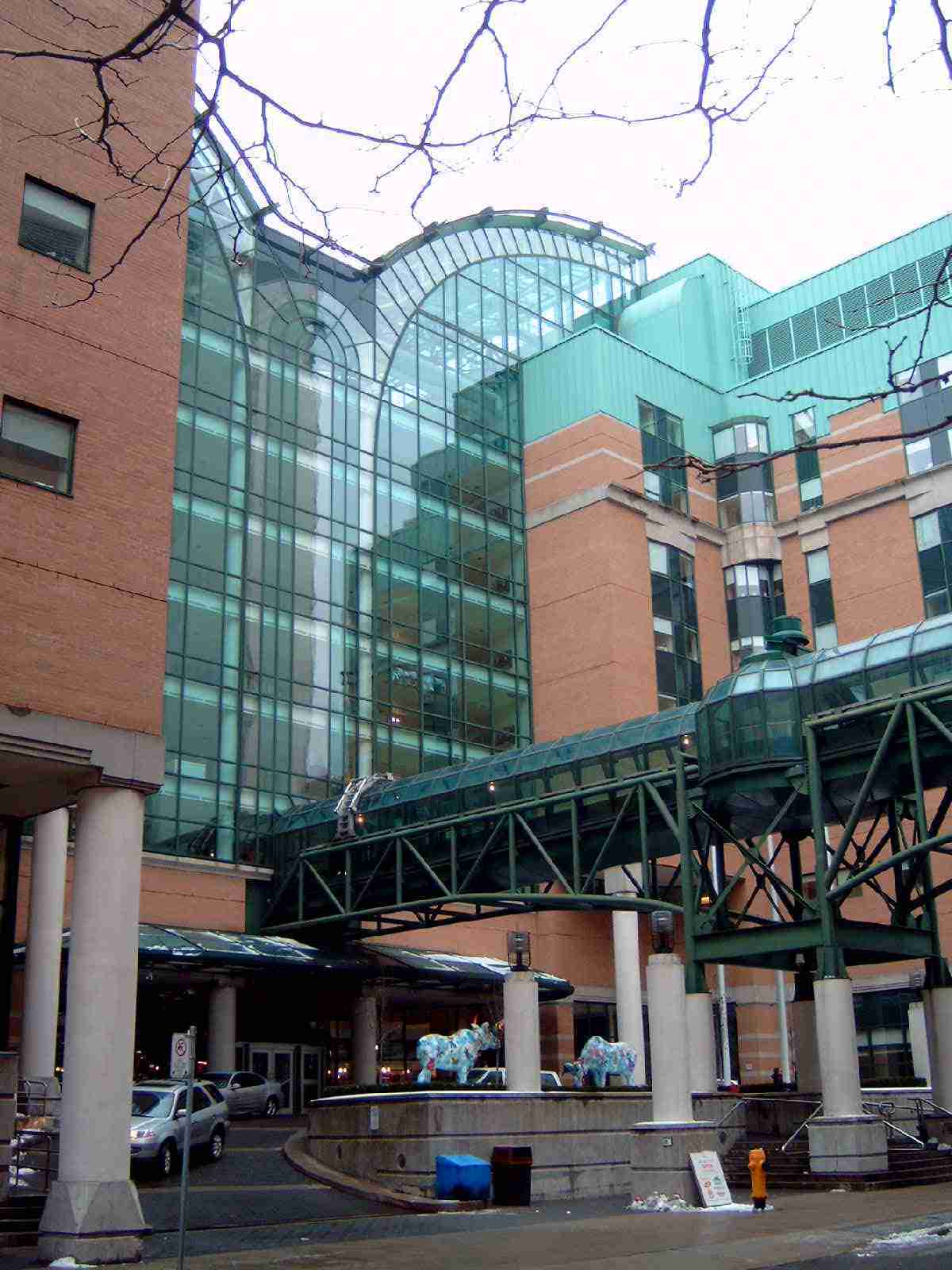
Hospital for Sick Children, Toronto

- Ajax
  - Lakeridge Health Ajax and Pickering
- Alliston
  - Stevenson Memorial Hospital
- Barrie
  - Royal Victoria Regional Health Centre
- Bowmanville
  - Lakeridge Health Bowmanville
- Brampton
  - Brampton Civic Hospital
  - Brampton Memorial Hospital Campus
- Brantford
  - Brantford General Hospital
- Burlington
  - Joseph Brant Hospital
- Campbellford
  - Campbellford Memorial Hospital
- Cambridge
  - Cambridge Memorial Hospital
- Cobourg
  - Northumberland Hills Hospital
- Collingwood
  - Collingwood General and Marine Hospital
- Deep River
  - Deep River and District Hospital
- Georgetown
  - Georgetown Hospital
- Grimsby
  - West Lincoln Memorial Hospital
- Hamilton
  - Hamilton Health Sciences
    - Hamilton General Hospital
    - Juravinski Hospital and Cancer Centre
    - McMaster University Medical Centre
    - McMaster Children's Hospital
    - St. Peter's Hospital
  - St. Joseph's Healthcare Hamilton
    - West 5th campus
    - Charlton campus
- Kingston
  - Kingston Health Sciences Centre (KHSC)
    - Kingston General Hospital (Integrated into KHSC, 2017)
    - Hotel Dieu (Integrated into KHSC, 2017)
  - Providence Continuing Care Centre (PCCC)
- Kirkland Lake
  - Blanche River Health Kirkland Lake site
- Kitchener
  - Grand River Hospital
  - St. Mary's General Hospital
- London
  - London Health Sciences Centre
    - Children's Hospital at London Health Sciences Centre
    - University Hospital
    - Victoria Hospital
- Markdale
  - Grey Bruce Health Services
- Meaford
  - Grey Bruce Health Services
- Milton
  - Milton District Hospital
- Mississauga
  - Credit Valley Hospital
  - Mississauga Hospital
- Napanee
  - Lennox & Addington County General Hospital
- Niagara Falls
  - Greater Niagara General Hospital (NHS - Niagara Falls Site)
- North Bay
  - North Bay Regional Health Center
- Oakville
  - Oakville-Trafalgar Memorial Hospital
- Orangeville
  - Headwaters Health Care Centre
- Orillia
  - Soldiers Memorial Hospital
- Oshawa
  - Lakeridge Health Oshawa
- Ottawa (see also: List of hospitals in Ottawa)
  - Children's Hospital of Eastern Ontario (CHEO)
  - Montfort Hospital
  - National Defence Medical Centre
  - The Ottawa Hospital
    - Civic Hospital
    - General Hospital
    - Riverside Hospital
  - Queensway Carleton Hospital
  - University of Ottawa Heart Institute
  - Royal Ottawa Mental Health Centre
- Owen Sound
  - Grey Bruce Health Services
- Penetanguishene
  - Waypoint Centre for Mental Health Care
- Peterborough
  - Peterborough Regional Health Centre
- Port Perry
  - Lakeridge Health Port Perry
- Quinte West
  - Trenton Memorial Hospital
- Sarnia
  - Bluewater Health
- Sault Ste. Marie
  - Sault Area Hospital
- St. Catharines
  - St. Catharines General Hospital (Niagara Health System)
  - Hotel Dieu Shaver Health and Rehabilitation Centre
- Sudbury
  - Health Sciences North
- Thunder Bay
  - Thunder Bay Regional Health Sciences Centre
- Toronto (see also: List of hospitals in Toronto)
  - Baycrest Health Sciences
  - Centre for Addiction and Mental Health
  - Etobicoke General Hospital
  - Hennick Humber Hospital
  - Hospital for Sick Children
  - Michael Garron Hospital
  - North York General Hospital
  - Queensway Health Centre
  - Scarborough Health Network
    - Birchmount Hospital
    - Centenary Hospital
    - Scarborough General Hospital
  - Sinai Health System
    - Bridgepoint Active Healthcare
    - Mount Sinai Hospital
  - St. John's Rehab Hospital
  - St. Joseph's Health Centre
  - St. Michael's Hospital
  - Sunnybrook Health Sciences Centre
  - Toronto Grace Health Centre
  - University Health Network
    - Princess Margaret Cancer Centre
    - Toronto General Hospital
    - Toronto Rehabilitation Institute
    - Toronto Western Hospital
    - West Park Healthcare Centre
  - Women's College Hospital
- Uxbridge
  - Uxbridge Cottage Hospital
- Welland
  - Welland County General Hospital (NHS - Welland Site)
- Wiarton
  - Wiarton Hospital
- Windsor
  - Hôtel-Dieu Grace Healthcare
  - Windsor Regional Hospital
    - Ouellette Campus
    - Met Campus
- York Region
  - Cortellucci Vaughan Hospital
  - Mackenzie Richmond Hill Hospital
  - Markham Stouffville Hospital
  - Southlake Regional Health Centre

== Prince Edward Island ==
- Charlottetown
  - Hillsborough Hospital
  - Queen Elizabeth Hospital
- Summerside
  - Prince County Hospital

== Quebec ==
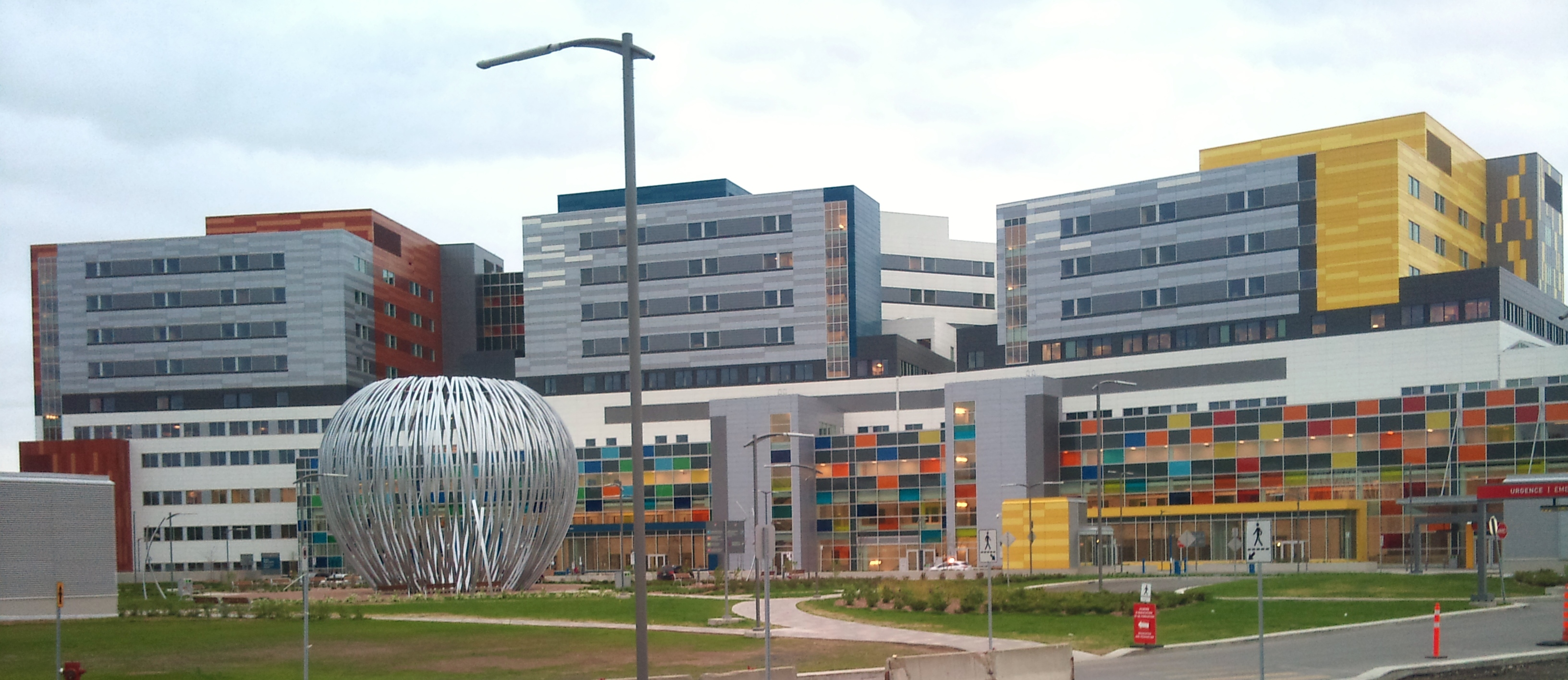
McGill University Health Centre (MUHC)

- Laval
  - Jewish Rehabilitation Hospital
- Longueuil
  - Hôpital Charles-LeMoyne (affiliated to Université de Sherbrooke)
  - Centre hospitalier Pierre-Boucher
- Montreal
  - McGill University Health Centre
    - Royal Victoria Hospital
    - Montreal Children's Hospital
    - Shriners Hospital for Children
    - Montreal Chest Institute
    - Montreal General Hospital
    - Allan Memorial Institute
    - Montreal Neurological Hospital
    - Hôpital de Lachine
  - Lakeshore General Hospital
  - Jewish General Hospital
  - St. Mary's Hospital
  - Douglas Mental Health University Institute
  - Centre hospitalier de l'Université de Montréal
  - Hopital Notre-Dame
  - Hôpital Maisonneuve-Rosemont
  - Hôpital du Sacré-Coeur de Montréal
  - Centre hospitalier universitaire Sainte-Justine
  - Institut de cardiologie de Montréal
  - Institut universitaire en santé mentale de Montréal
  - Institut Philippe-Pinel de Montréal
  - Hôpital Santa-Cabrini
  - Hôpital de Verdun
  - Hôpital de LaSalle
  - Hôpital Jean-Talon
  - Hôpital Rivière-des-Prairies
- Saint-Hyacinthe
  - Centre hospitalier Honoré-Mercier
- Quebec City
  - Centre hospitalier universitaire de Québec (CHUQ)
    - Hôtel-Dieu de Québec
    - Hôpital Saint-François d'Assise
    - Centre hospitalier de l'Université Laval (CHUL)
  - Institut universitaire de cardiologie et de pneumologie de Québec (IUCPQ)
- Sherbrooke
  - Centre hospitalier universitaire de Sherbrooke (CHUS)

== Saskatchewan ==
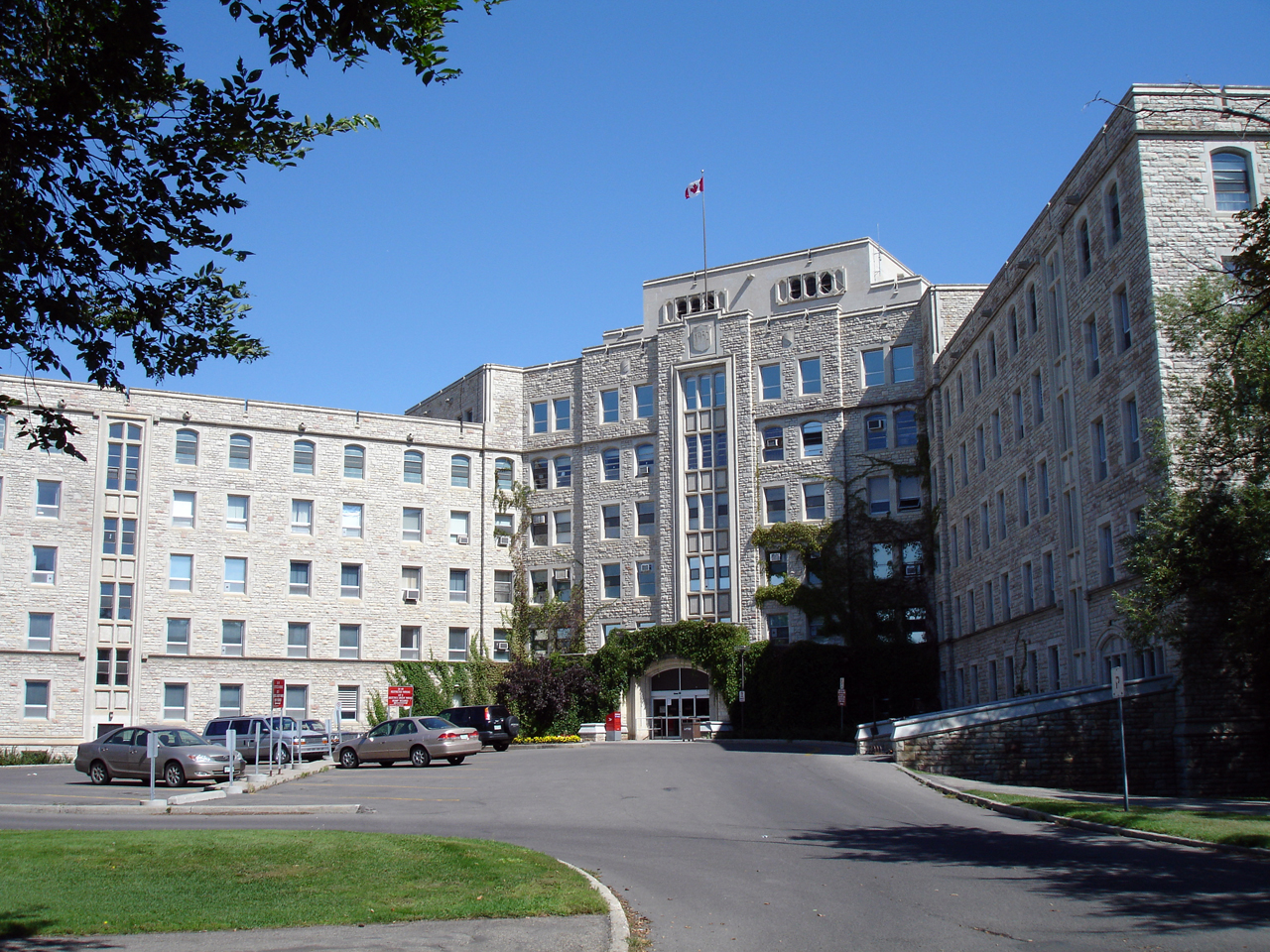
Royal University Hospital

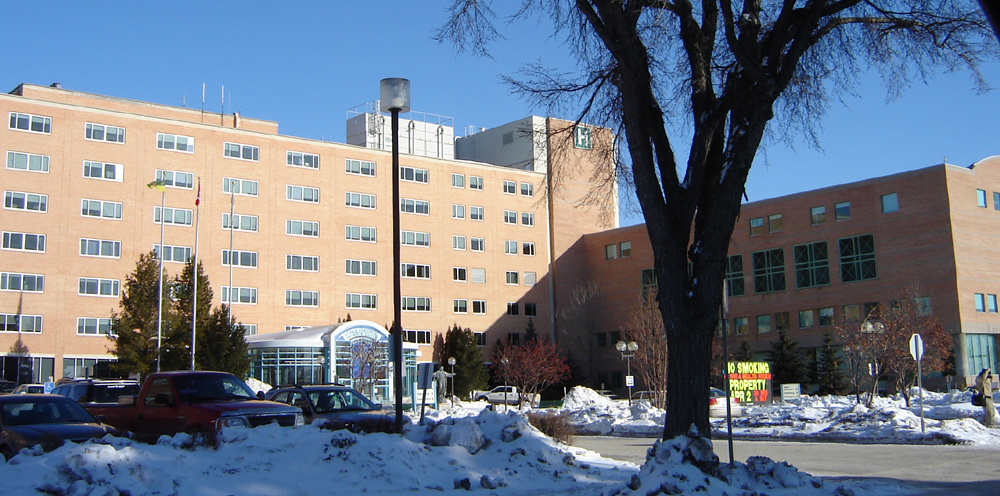
St. Paul's Hospital

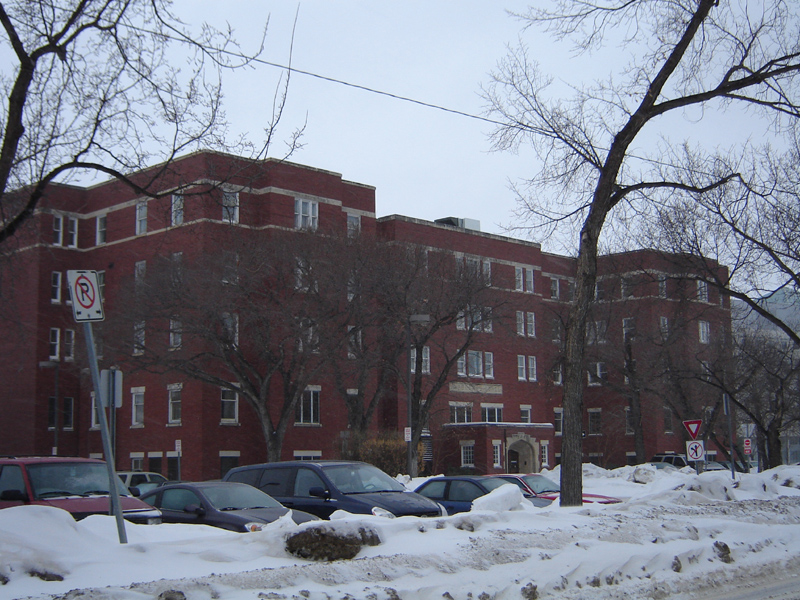
City Hospital

- Humboldt
  - Humboldt District Hospital
- Regina
  - Pasqua Hospital
  - Regina General Hospital
  - Wascana Rehabilitation Centre
- Saskatoon
  - Royal University Hospital
  - Saskatoon City Hospital
  - St. Paul's Hospital
  - Jim Pattison Children's Hospital

== Yukon ==
- Dawson City Community Hospital
- Whitehorse General Hospital
