= New Brunswick neurological syndrome of unknown cause =

Possible degenerative disease

A neurological syndrome of unknown cause was suggested as a potential novel degenerative disease in a cluster of individuals with similar clinical signs and symptoms in the Canadian province of New Brunswick beginning in 2019. The existence of this syndrome became the subject of several investigations including by federal and provincial governments, extensive media coverage, and scientific scrutiny. Symptoms listed on the New Brunswick Public Health (NBPH) website include memory problems, muscle spasms, balance problems, difficulty walking or falls, blurred vision or visual hallucinations, unexplained or significant weight loss, behaviour changes, and pain in the upper or lower limbs.

The existence of the neurological syndrome was originally promoted by neurologist Alier Marrero, who diagnosed hundreds of patients with the condition. Subsequent investigations by other neurologists, neuropathologists, and the Province of New Brunswick suggest that the syndrome does not correspond to a single neurological disease, that all re-examined cases of the proposed neurological syndrome corresponded to well-known conditions such as Parkinson's disease and Alzheimer's disease, that some alleged symptoms could not be substantiated upon re-examination, that the rapidity of onset had been overestimated in some cases, and that a single underlying cause for the proposed syndrome cannot be identified.

== Background ==
The investigation into the cluster was instigated in 2019 at the federal level by the Ottawa-based Creutzfeldt-Jakob Disease Surveillance System (CJDSS) unit – which operates under Public Health Agency of Canada (PHAC). CJDSS director Michael Coulthart worked with Alier Marrero, a neurologist at Dr. Georges-L.-Dumont University Hospital Centre, in Moncton, New Brunswick who had referred cases to the CJDSS unit for testing and diagnosis. The disease cluster was first noted through the routine case management arrangement between New Brunswick and federal health authorities, when experts from the CJDSS unit – which provides surveillance for "all types of human prion disease in Canada" – noticed a significant number of NB referrals had "some common symptoms and similar potential diagnostic profiles". The CJDSS ruled out any prion disorder, including Creutzfeldt-Jakob Disease (CJD) – an incurable, fatal disease. Marrero and Coulthart and colleagues worked for months together investigating the cases. The federal-provincial team began to suspect that they were looking at a novel neurological degenerative disease potentially caused by a toxin or agent. By December 2020, 24 new cases in New Brunswick of something that "looked like CJD but was not" had been diagnosed. PHAC considered this to be an "unusually high number" and contacted New Brunswick's Chief Medical Officer of Health (CMOH) Jennifer Russell, about the disease cluster. In January 2021, the CJDSS and Marrero updated the case definition of the syndrome, which had been first drafted in December 2020. The definition was then accepted by Public Health New Brunswick.

In March 2021, provincial health authorities shared information describing symptoms with New Brunswick physicians in a memorandum that was leaked to the media. On 27 April 2021, NBPH published a webpage which is updated to inform the public of the disease cluster, its symptoms, ongoing investigations and their findings.

== Symptoms ==
In a 25 March 2021 interview, Marrero said that initial symptoms are often nonspecific, making a diagnosis challenging. He listed symptoms such as "behavioral changes, sleep disturbances, unexplained pain, visual hallucinations, coordination problems, unexplained hair loss, involuntary muscle twitching, formication (a sensation that feels like small insects crawling under the skin), ataxia, and brain atrophy".

In April the NBPH website listed symptoms such as memory problems, muscle spasms, balance issues, difficulty walking or falls, blurred vision or visual hallucinations, unexplained or significant weight loss, behaviour changes and pain in the upper or lower limbs.

In interviews conducted by the media, patients and their families described symptoms such as rapidly progressing dementia, unexplained and significant weight loss, myoclonus, aphasia, changes in behaviour, sleep disturbances, unexplained pain, visual hallucinations, co-ordination problems and severe muscle and brain atrophy, progressing over a period of 18 to 36 months. The majority experience multi-day insomnia even with "sleep medication". Memory loss and aphasia are seen. In some cases, Capgras delusion and echolalia have been reported. Myoclonus persists "even in the late stages of the disease" and even "when patients are unconscious". Akinetic mutism were observed in late-stage patients, where they no longer have the ability to speak or move. The New York Times reported symptoms of "extreme fatigue, involuntary jerking movements, memory lapses and hallucinations" on 4 June 2021.

== Demographics ==
The cases suggest that the proposed syndrome affects men and women equally. Cases have been reported in all age groups from 18 to 86, with a median age of patients being 59 years old.

== Etiology ==
The working name used by investigators to the disease was "neurological syndrome of unknown etiology in New Brunswick". The CMOH referred to it as progressive neurological syndrome of unknown cause", and it is now called "neurological syndrome of unknown cause" on the NBPH website.

A 17 March 2021 CBC News report said that the disease was not genetic, and could be contracted from water, food or air.

According to a 25 March 2021 Medscape Medical News article, Marrero said that some experts considered the possibility that Creutzfeldt-Jakob Lookalike might be a "toxic, non-proteinogenic amino acid linked to neurodegeneration".

On 26 March, Coulthart said that the disease "may be linked to environmental exposure" most notably "chemical exposures", and downplayed the likelihood of CJD. In a 5 May BBC report, Cashman said that one of the toxins to be investigated was beta-Methylamino-L-alanine (BMAA), a neurotoxin which is produced by cyanobacteria in marine, freshwater, and terrestrial environments. BMAA is currently the subject of scientific research for its potential role in a number of degenerative neurological diseases. Blue-green algae has been spreading in New Brunswick waterways. In her 27 October press conference, New Brunswick Health Minister Dorothy Shephard said that the NBPH report based on the enhanced interviews had ruled out blue-green algae, contaminated shellfish, and pesticides as potential causes for the mystery brain disease.

The findings of the NBPH epidemiological review, published on 26 October 2021, were based on 34 detailed telephone interviews by NBPH nurses from May to September. The report concluded that there were "no specific behaviours, foods, or environmental exposures that can be identified as potential risk factors with regards to the identified cluster of cases with a potential neurological syndrome of unknown cause". The NBPH webpage was updated to assure area residents that the investigation did not point "to algae blooms as being a potential source or cause of symptoms".

== Cases ==
In 2013, Marrero had requested CJDSS assistance in running tests on a suspected case of Creutzfeldt-Jakob disease (CJD) – an incurable, fatal disease. The results were negative. PHAC's CJDSS provided specialized expertise by interpreting diagnostic and providing autopsy results. The patient was retroactively identified as experiencing symptoms of the syndrome, according to NBPH. Marrero, who has since treated most of the 48 patients in the unknown disease cluster, said that he had detected "unusually young patients with progressive neurological symptoms in the Moncton and Acadian Peninsula areas" as early as 2013, according to a 28 October 2021 CBC News report.

On 17 March 2021 it was disclosed that "in 2019, 11 cases were discovered, with 24 more cases discovered in 2020 and another six cases in 2021". At the time, 42 possible cases had been tallied, and five people had died from the disease.

As of 25 April 2021, the cluster had been expanded to 47 possible cases. Of the 47, 37 were confirmed and 10 were suspected cases.

By April 2021, six deaths had been linked to the disease, but the NBPH said that "in some cases, additional information is needed to determine if the cause of death was a result" of the syndrome. The Department of Health restated the history at this time, as the first patient displayed symptoms in 2013 (instead of 2015 as had previously been reported) though that was deduced only in 2020.

According to a letter from Marrero to federal and provincial officials in February 2025, there were 507 patients suffering from unexplained neurological symptoms. 222 have been formally reported to NBHP.

== Autopsy reports ==
PHAC contracted a neuropathologist, Gerard Jansen, at the Eastern Ontario Regional Laboratory Association (EORLA) to perform autopsies on eight of the deceased. According to CBC News, Jansen said in May 2021 that he had diagnosed all five patients who had autopsies at that time and that he had "reviewed patient files for members of the cluster as part of his PHAC contract".

A 4 June New York Times reported that the Ottawa-based federal laboratory was conducting brain autopsies related to six cases "while a team of neurologists and pathologists from across Canada is reviewing the evidence". Times article reported on the brain autopsies and cited CJDSS director Coulthart, who said that the three autopsies were negative "for known forms of prion disease". The article said that the federal-provincial health authorities team included "neurologists, epidemiologists, environmentalists and veterinarians" and that "a team of neurologists and pathologists from across Canada" was "reviewing the evidence". In a 3 June CBC report, Vitalité director Natalie Banville, said that they did not have the results of the three autopsies at that time.

At the end of August, Jansen presented his autopsy results to the federal-provincial oversight committee, according to New Brunswick Health Minister Dorothy Shephard. On 7 October Jansen published the results of the eight autopsies on Canadian Association of Neuropathologists (CANP) website. During the 61st annual meeting of the CANP, Jansen presented his findings to 20 to 30 colleagues in which he suggested that the eight patients previously diagnosed with the novel neurological syndrome, "represent a group of misclassified clinical diagnoses", and that they "died from a variety of causes, including cancer, Lewy body dementia and Alzheimer's disease". The abstract said that "in these eight patients no evidence for a prion disease was found, nor novel pathology". The virtual meeting of the CANP was held from the 14 to 16 October. Soon after the meeting, Jansen's autopsy results were published by the media – whose sources are unknown – before family members, the PHAC, the OCHOH, or Marrero were consulted. Jansen told CBC that it was not "surprising" that neither Marrero nor PHAC seemed to support his findings or conclusions that the eight patients previously diagnosed with the syndrome of unknown causes, "represent a group of misclassified clinical diagnoses". New Brunswick Public Health requested Jansen's "final autopsy reports" in late September 2021 and received them by 24 September.

A November 2021 article in The BMJ reported that the results of the autopsies caused some to question the existence of New Brunswick's "novel neurological syndrome".

== Geographic region ==
As of April 2021, the syndrome had only been identified in the province of New Brunswick, with thirty-five cases in the Acadian Peninsula, eight cases in the Moncton region and one case of undisclosed origin.

The mayor of Caraquet said that the town was "trying to live normally, but everybody has that in the back of their mind".

== Investigations ==
=== Federal-provincial investigations ===
In 2019, through routine case management between the New Brunswick Regional Health Authorities and the federal Ottawa-based Creutzfeldt-Jakob Disease Surveillance System (CJDSS), CJDSS had observed that a significant number of referrals from New Brunswick had "some common symptoms and similar potential diagnostic profiles". While the cases tested negative for CJD, CJDSS concluded that "these referrals represented a cluster of cases that were worth further investigation". In 2019, 11 cases had been discovered.

In December 2020, the CJDSS – which operates under Public Health Agency of Canada (PHAC) – notified CMOH Russell about an "unusually high number of cases of something in the province that looked like CJD but was not". CJDSS director Coulthart, who has worked with prion diseases for 20 years was named as the federal lead.

By January 2021, a working name – "New Brunswick neurological syndrome of unknown cause" – was adopted and a case definition was being prepared. Deputy CMOH, Cristin Muecke, shared this information through a 5 March memo in which she described symptoms to watch for and encouraged referrals to the newly created specialized Mind Clinic at Moncton Hospital or to CJDSS.

By April 2021, the NBPH was involved in an investigation in partnership with the New Brunswick Department of Agriculture, Aquaculture and Fisheries, Department of Energy and Resource Development, and Department of Environment and Local Government, PHAC, and the Canadian Food Inspection Agency. By late spring 2021, at the request of the New Brunswick provincial government, two federal agencies – PHAC and the Canadian Institutes of Health Research (CIHR) – were involved in working with the province to establish a nationwide working group of about two dozen experts, which included CJDSS' Coulthart, CIHR president and neuropath, Michael Strong, and Neil Cashman, a neurologist at the University of British Columbia who was "advising the investigation, mostly over Zoom".

The outbreak captured the global attention of specialists after the announcement of the emerging disease was posted on the global Program for Monitoring Emerging Diseases site.

=== Special Neurodegenerative Disorder Clinic (the Mind Clinic) ===
At the end of May, the province opened a special clinic at Moncton Hospital for patients. At her 3 June press conference, Shephard said that 40 patients had already been seen at the Special Neurodegenerative Disorder Clinic–the Mind Clinic, which is operated by Horizon Health Network. The April 2021 press release announcing its launch, promising the clinic would have a social worker, and a clinical psychologist. By 29 May 2021, the Special Neurodegenerative Disorder Clinic – which is operated by Horizon Health Network – hosted four doctors, with Marrero as its head. The Horizon Health Network had announced its opening as a way of assessing and supporting people suspected of having neurological syndrome of unknown cause. By 15 July, Marrero was seeing Mind Clinic patients at Dr. Georges-L.-Dumont University Hospital Centre, because the Horizon Health Network's Special Neurodegenerative Disorder Clinic–the Mind Clinic at Moncton Hospital at Moncton Hospital was understaffed. A Horizon vice president, Édouard Hendriks, said that the Mind Clinic was operational and at that time had three doctors and a part-time administrative support employee. Other positions to be filled included a research co-ordinator, occupational therapist, social worker, and a clinical psychologist. Marrero treated most of the 48 patients in the unknown disease cluster.

In a 27 July 2021 letter to affected patients and their families, Shephard said that more full-time staff would be hired, including a social worker and a psychologist at the Mind Clinic in Moncton where the investigation is underway. From the time of its opening in spring until mid-July, the Mind Clinic had 81 registered patients. Only the original 48, who had been identified with similar clinical symptoms from early 2020 to the end of May 2021, were included in the enhanced epidemiological survey. Shephard said: "Those first 48 are going to help us determine the path we need to go forward with – either a potential diagnosis or the potential of going forward with an unknown neurological syndrome."

=== Enhanced epidemiological review ===
Marrero reported in March that along with a battery of tests, "extensive lifestyle questionnaires aimed at unearthing a common environmental link" would be an important part of their investigations.

Minister Shephard established a NBPH-led epidemiological review to investigate the "potential cluster of neurological syndrome". The mandate of the epidemiological review was to "explore potential risk factors and exposures" through an "epidemiological enhanced survey. The NBPH epidemiological review consisted of a questionnaire which was conducted by telephone by public health nurses from May to September. Of the 48 potential cases identified in the cluster, 34 people participated in the survey. The provincial epidemiological review found that there were "no specific behaviors, or food or environmental exposure that was identified as potential risk factors", according to an October 2021 CPAC update.

In a 27 October 2021 CPAC update on unknown neurological disease, which included Minister Shephard and the directors of the province's two health authorities – Vitalité Health Network's Natalie Banville, and Horizon Health Network's Susan Brien, Shephard clarified that the current and ongoing public health investigation was composed of two different teams in two parts – the epidemiological review of the cluster to "explore potential risk factors and exposures", and the clinical review.

The provincial epidemiological review found that there were "no specific behaviours, foods, or environmental exposures that can be identified as potential risk factors with regards to the identified cluster of cases with a potential neurological syndrome of unknown cause". It was based on an enhanced survey conducted by telephone from May to September with 34 of the 48 cases participating.

=== New Brunswick oversight committee clinical review ===
On 3 June 2021, Shephard announced the creation of a new nine-person oversight committee to help investigate the syndrome. The clinical review committee is chaired by directors of New Brunswick's two health authorities – Vitalité Health Network and Horizon Health Network. Committee members include six New Brunswick neurologists, a Public Health representative, and six New Brunswick neurologists who have no connection to patients who had been previously identified with the syndrome.

The clinical oversight committee was "to provide a second opinion of Marrero's work" and "review the complete clinical history and diagnosis of each patient in the group". In February, 2022, the oversight committee "found that each patient displayed symptoms that varied significantly and there is no evidence of a shared common illness or a syndrome of unknown cause."

As of 3 November, the GNB CMOH webpage, which has been regularly updated since it was first launched in April 2021, raised questions about the existence of a new disease and seemed to raise doubts on Marrero. The site now says that, this cluster is "unexpected, which is why the cluster is being actively investigated by Public Health New Brunswick in collaboration with the established Oversight Committee composed of neurologists and chaired by VPs from both RHAs. In addition, other local and national subject matter experts and health-care providers will be engaged as required. ... At the time of referral by their health-care provider, most of the individuals under investigation were living in the southeastern and northeastern regions of New Brunswick, around the Acadian Peninsula and Moncton areas. However, the investigation has not found any evidence suggesting that the residents of these regions are more at risk than those living elsewhere in the province. All but two of the cases in the potential neurological syndrome of unknown cause were referred by one neurologist and locations could be a reflection of that physician's catchment area. Neurologists from across the country were asked to report cases with similar symptoms but none have been reported to date."

=== JAMA Neurology study ===
In 2025, JAMA Neurology published a study reassessing 25 of the 222 cases submitted to NBPH. When contacted for the study, 52 patients had declined a secondary evaluation, deciding to stay with Marrero, "the [one] neurologist who originally made and continues to promote the diagnosis of a mystery disease." Of the 25, 11 were autopsy evaluations while 14 were clinical evaluations. The study found that there was "no support for an undiagnosed mystery disease in New Brunswick," and that all could be attributed to well-known neurological diseases like Alzheimer's disease or Parkinson's. They also found that there was "strong evidence against a common cause of the patients’ conditions, such as exposure to an environmental toxin." The study attributed the misdiagnoses to misinterpreted medical histories, misinterpreted physical examinations, and "overreliance on or misinterpretation of ancillary testing such as EEG and SPECT". In response, Marrero stated that he was "in profound disagreement with the study conclusions", and questioned the study methods and content.

== Media coverage ==
As early as 16 March 2021, Ici Radio-Canada journalist Nicolas Steinbach reported about "une maladie inconnue" – a mystery disease – in New Brunswick. A whistleblower had leaked deputy CHOH, Muecke's 5 March memo to the Canadian Broadcasting Corporation's (CBC) French-language counterpart. CBC's English version was published on 17 March On the same day, CBC published a more in-depth story also informed by Steinbach's research which said that NBPH was monitoring over 40 cases of the unknown disease. The Toronto Star published their story about a "cluster of patients with unknown brain disease" on 18 March. On 5 March 2021, deputy CMOH, Cristin Muecke, had sent a memo to medical professionals in the province requesting that they watch for symptoms of the syndrome and encourage referral of any possible cases to the newly created Special Neurodegenerative Disorder Clinic in Moncton Hospital, where Marrero was director, or to the CJDSS.

On 19 March Global News reported on CMOH Russell's 18 March press conference in which Russell said that a "rare neurological disease" had been "detected" in New Brunswick and that it "most likely is a new disease". Russell said that Marrero, the neurologist working on the cluster, had suggested that the disease could be caused from a "food source, from a water source or an environmental source". Russell listed symptoms such as "rapidly progressing dementia", unusual weight loss, "tightening of the muscles", uncoordinated gait, and muscle atrophy.

Based on the memo, the CBC reported that in 2019, the CJDSS had identified a cluster of eleven cases in New Brunswick, with "some common symptoms and similar potential diagnostic profiles" that merited "further investigation". Marrero and his federal PHAC colleagues began to consider the possibility that the cluster might be a "distinct, previously undescribed neurological disease". The cluster was given the working name of "Progressive Neurological Symptoms of Unknown Etiology in New Brunswick". The international media covered the story. In March, an article about the "mystery brain disorder" by the British newspaper The Guardian featured an interview with a University of Alberta professor who said that the symptoms did not reflect a defined syndrome, due to a lack of information. Global News interviewed Steve Ellis, whose father, Roger, is severely affected by an unknown disease. Ellis lived near Bathurst and had retired from Brunswick Mines. On 8 April The National aired a six-minute television segment on the syndrome with a focus on Roger Ellis.

CBC's Marie Sutherland wrote several articles in early April in which she raised concerns about the numbers in the cluster and the lack of information from NBPH. At the time of her report, April 20, NBPH had not "provided any public updates", or "held information sessions in the affected communities or elsewhere, and has not issued any news releases regarding the mystery disease cases. It also has not said where, specifically, any of the cases were identified." As of 7 April 2021, there was a cluster of 44 possible cases and six deaths. Sutherland interviewed the multiple families who shared their frustration about the "wall of silence" on the "mystery brain disease". Joanne Graves, the daughter of an affected woman, was "infuriated" at the "lack of transparency on the issue and by the fact that it did not disclose the cluster until after the memo was leaked".

COVID-19 has slowed the work of scientists and doctors investigating the new disease, according to a 12 May 2021 article in The Washington Post. In his interview with the Post, Marrero said that "diagnostic imaging and spinal taps" – used to diagnose degenerative neurological syndromes – had been cancelled because of the pandemic.

The New York Times 4 June article on the "mysterious brain syndrome" also reported on autopsy results of three of the eight cases.

Following the revelation about the results of the autopsy reports, and the release of the first NBPH report, CBC published a series of articles saying that the cases may have been misdiagnosed.

The Walrus published an in-depth story on 22 October raising concerns that Shephard had allegedly shut out federal experts from the investigation into the disease in early June. In an interview with a senior scientist on the syndrome investigative team, who asked for anonymity, they said that in early June, the "highest levels of the New Brunswick government" had taken control of the investigation and had told the federal authorities to stand down. Experts who were equipped with a "capable set of tools to look at biological and epidemiological and environmental characteristics" had been "inexplicably sidelined" and their expertise left untapped. The scientist said that in similar epidemiological situations, autopsy findings that patients had other known pathologies do not exclude the possibility that there is a novel or new syndrome. The scientist raised concerns that these autopsy results would be accepted as providing the full answer as to the existence or non-existence of a disease cluster, and that the province would not follow through with further investigations. Michael Halliday, who wrote The Walrus article, reported on the 1 November 2021, CBC News Front Burner podcast that provincial NBPH officials had shifted their strategy, "changed course", and "cast doubts on whether the symptoms are indeed caused by a neurological illness". Halliday said that this has frustrated patients and their families.

According to 4 November 2021 episode of CBC The Fifth Estate, Minister Shephard had begun to refer to the syndrome as a "potential" disease at a 3 June press conference held to announce the establishment of a New Brunswick Public Health two-pronged investigation. When asked why the PHAC and other federal scientists were no longer involved in the investigation, Shephard said that, since all cases had been diagnosed in New Brunswick and not elsewhere, it was the province's responsibility to investigate. The episode featured one of the original 48 patients who consulted a doctor at the Toronto-based University Health Network's Krembil Brain Institute for a second opinion. The doctor found that his symptoms were related to a 2018 concussion, not the syndrome. In an interview for the feature, Minister Shephard said she "does not believe there is a cluster" and that NBPH were "really a little premature" in reporting the existence of the syndrome.

In June 2024, The Guardian published an article about emails that were leaked, in which Michael Coulthart alleged that he was restricted from conducting an investigation, saying "all I will say is that my scientific opinion is that there is something real going on in [New Brunswick] that absolutely cannot be explained by the bias or personal agenda of an individual neurologist." The New York Times published an article on 14 August 2024, stating that Marrero "believes the number of people seeking help with similar symptoms is now over 400". Megan Mitton, a legislative member for the Green Party of New Brunswick, called "for a public inquiry into what happened internally between the province and Ottawa" in response to the article's publication.

By the end of 2025, the number of patients in the potential cluster had reached approximately 500.
