= Jewish Rehabilitation Hospital =

Geography
- Location: Laval, Quebec, Canada
- Coordinates: 45.5486°N 73.7377°W

Organization
- Type: Specialist
- Religious affiliation: Jewish
- Affiliated university: McGill University

Services
- Speciality: Rehabilitation hospital

History
- Former names: Jewish Convalescent Center, Jewish Convalescent Hospital
- Opened: 1955

Links
- Website: www.hjr-jrh.qc.ca
- Lists: Hospitals in Canada

The Jewish Rehabilitation Hospital (JRH) is a bilingual hospital offering general and specialized rehabilitation services in Laval, Quebec, Canada. It is the regional center in physical rehabilitation for adult and pediatric clients.

== History ==
In 1955, the Jewish Convalescent Center opened.

In 1962, the institution was renamed the Jewish Convalescent Hospital. Administration employed health professionals, causing the amount of effectives to double. This marked the beginning of a professional era of expertise.

In 1988, the institution took the name of Jewish Rehabilitation Hospital, reflecting the evolution of the expertise, its role, and its mission.

Major losses in funding in 2013 resulted in the abolition of an entire care unit. Twenty beds were lost and about sixty employees were laid off.

== University affiliation ==
The JRH, which is affiliated with McGill University, has the objective of contributing to research, education, and assessment in the fields of technology and methods of clinical intervention. The hospital also holds affiliations with Université de Montréal, Collège Montmorency, Vanier College, and Dawson College.

== Jewish Rehabilitation Hospital Foundation ==
The JRH Foundation contributes to enhancements in healthcare and innovations in the field of rehabilitation medicine.

== See also ==
- Jewish General Hospital
- Hôpital Maisonneuve-Rosemont
- Hôpital du Sacré-Cœur de Montréal
- Centre hospitalier universitaire Sainte-Justine
- Centre hospitalier de l'Université de Montréal
- Centre hospitalier de St-Mary
