= CentraCare =

CentraCare, Centra Care or Centracare may refer to:

== Canada ==
- Centracare (hospital), a psychiatric hospital in New Brunswick

== United States ==
- CentraCare Health System, a system of health care providers in Minnesota
- Florida Hospital Centra Care, a system of urgent care centers in Florida.
