= Charles Le Moyne =

Charles Le Moyne is the name of:

- Charles Le Moyne (actor) (1880-1956), American actor of the silent film era
- Charles le Moyne de Longueuil et de Châteauguay (1626-1685), settler in New France, now Canada
- Charles le Moyne de Longueuil, Baron de Longueuil (1656-1729), governor in New France
- Charles Le Moyne Mitchell (1844-1890), American politician
- Charles LeMoyne Hospital, a hospital in Greenfield Park, Quebec, Canada
