= HCLM =

HCLM can refer to

- Hôpital Charles-LeMoyne, a hospital in Longueuil, Canada
- Horse-chestnut leaf miner, a leaf-mining moth of the family Gracillariidae
