= List of hospitals in Ottawa =

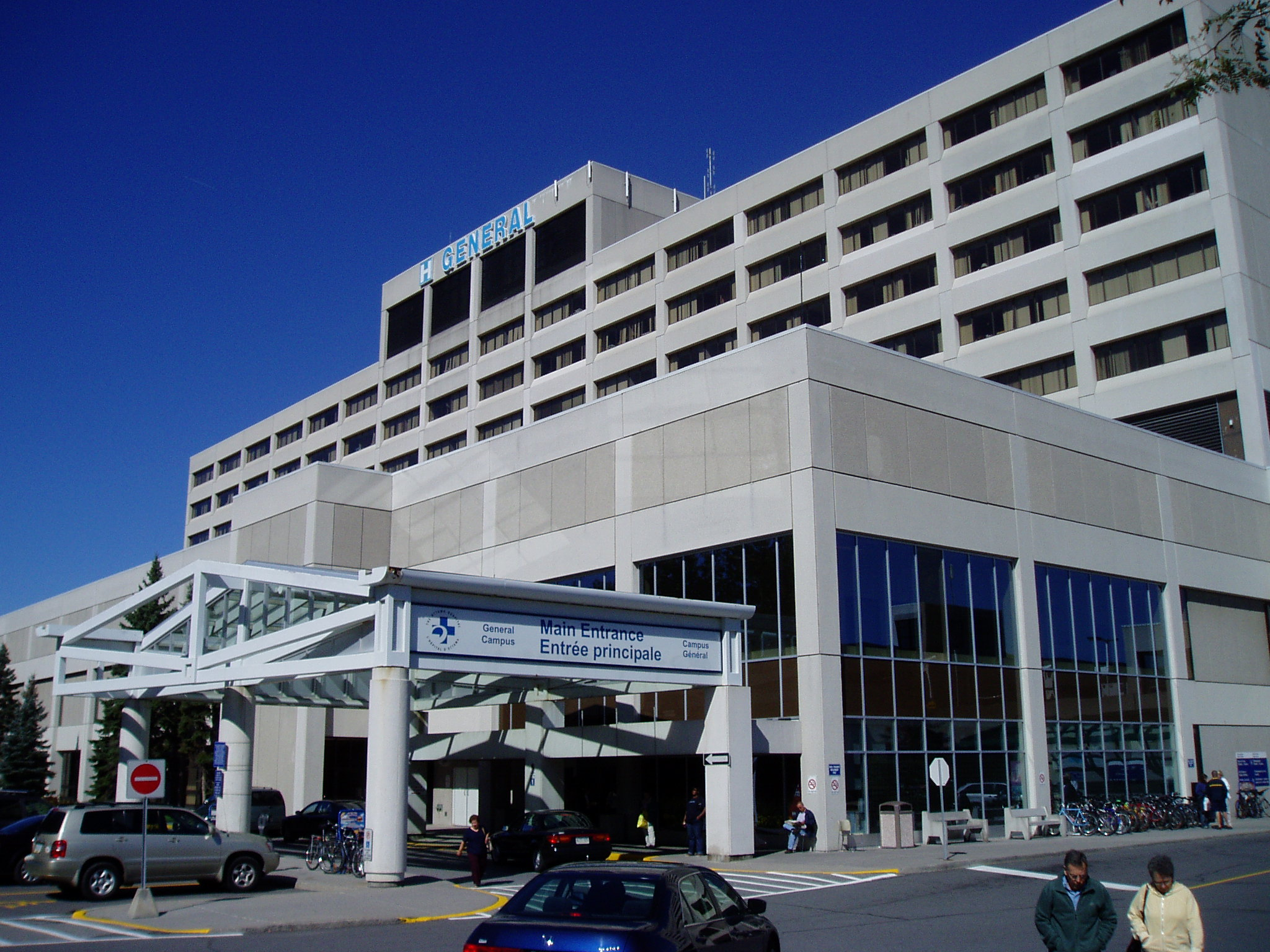
General Campus of the Ottawa Hospital

List of hospitals in Ottawa.

== General Care ==
- Children's Hospital of Eastern Ontario (CHEO) (401 Smyth Road)
- Montfort Hospital (713 Montreal Road)
- National Defence Medical Centre (713 Montreal Road)
- The Ottawa Hospital campuses:
  - Riverside Hospital (1967 Riverside Drive)
  - General Hospital (501 Smyth Road)
  - Civic Hospital (1053 Carling Avenue)
- Queensway Carleton Hospital (3045 Baseline Road)

== Specialized Care ==
- University of Ottawa Heart Institute (40 Ruskin Street)
- Royal Ottawa Mental Health Centre (1145 Carling Avenue)
- Élisabeth Bruyère Hospital (43 Bruyère Street)
- St. Vincent Hospital (60 Cambridge Street North)
- Perley & Rideau Veteran's Health Centre (1750 Russell Road)

== Surrounding region ==
=== Ontario ===
- Almonte General Hospital (75 Spring Street)
- Arnprior Regional Health (350 John Street North)
- Carleton Place & District Memorial Hospital (211 Lake Avenue East)
- Perth & Smiths Falls District Hospitals
  - Perth (33 Drummond Street West)
  - Smiths Falls (60 Cornelia Street West)
- Kemptville District Hospital (2675 Concession Road)
- Winchester District Memorial Hospital (566 Louise Street)
- Amis Health Care Services Inc. - Senior Care (1730 St. Laurent Blvd)

=== Gatineau, Quebec ===
- Hôpital de Gatineau (909 Boulevard la Vérendrye Ouest)
- Hull Hospital (116 Boulevard Lionel-Émond)
- Hospital De Papineau (155 Rue Maclaren Est)
- Hôpital en santé mentale Pierre-Janet (20 Rue Pharand)
