= Brandon Regional Health Centre =

Hospital in Brandon, Manitoba, Canada

- Prairie Mountain Health Authority

Geography
- Location: 150 McTavish Ave East, Brandon, Manitoba, Canada
- Coordinates: 49°50′24″N 99°56′09″W

Organization
- Care system: Public Medicare (Canada)
- Type: General

Services
- Emergency department: Yes
- Beds: 305

Links
- Website: prairiemountainhealth.ca/our-locations/brandon
- Lists: Hospitals in Canada

Brandon Regional Health Centre is a hospital in Brandon, Manitoba, one of 20 hospitals operated by the Prairie Mountain Health. The Brandon Regional Health Centre is the largest hospital in the Westman Region. The Western Manitoba Cancer Centre opened at the hospital in 2011 at a cost of CA$24 million.
