= Brantford General Hospital =

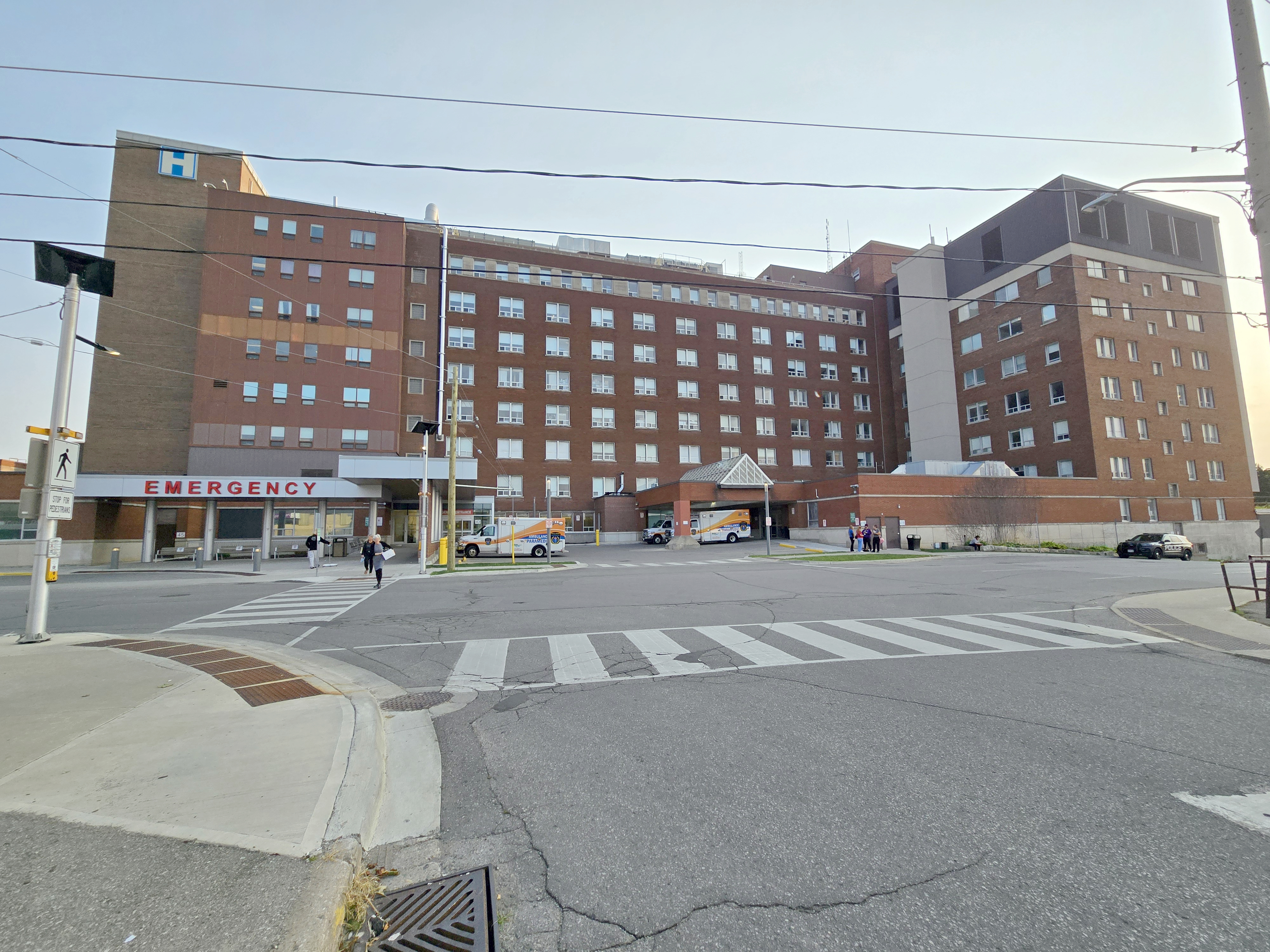
- Brantford General Hospital.jpg

Geography
- Location: 200 Terrace Hill Street, Brantford, Ontario, Canada
- Coordinates: 43°9′7.84″N 80°16′36.02″W

Organization
- Network: Brant Community Healthcare System

Services
- Beds: 299

History
- Former name: John H. Stratford Hospital
- Opened: 1885

Links
- Website: www.bchsys.org
- Lists: Hospitals in Canada

Brantford General Hospital is located in Brantford, Ontario, Canada. It is one of two hospitals in the Brant Community Healthcare System.

== Overview ==
Brantford General Hospital is a 299-bed acute care facility with a staff of 2,100. The hospital has an emergency department, and is a regional centre for surgical services, paediatrics, obstetrics, and mental health. The Brant Community Cancer Clinic and the S.C. Johnson Dialysis Clinic are located here.

== History ==
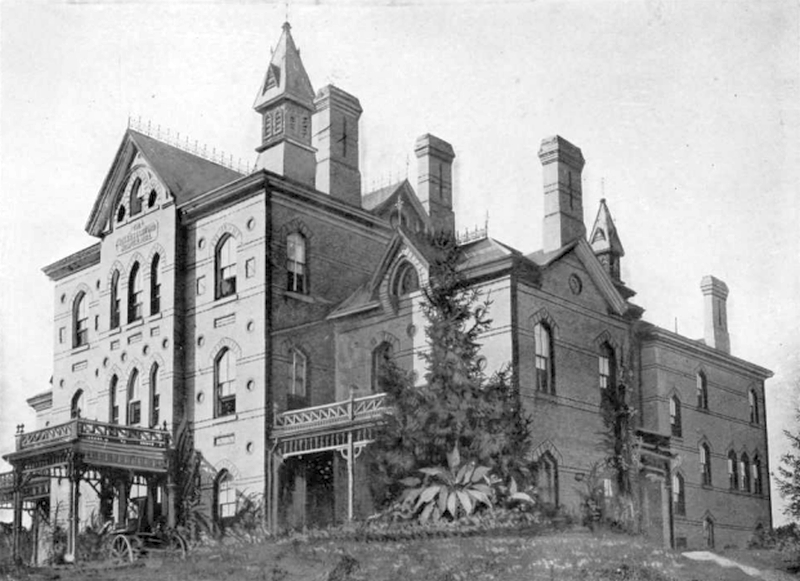
John H. Stratford Hospital, circa 1900

The hospital opened in 1885 as the John H. Stratford Hospital on 7 acres (2.8 ha) of land donated by John H. Stratford. The three-story, 40-bed hospital was located "upon the brow of Terrace Hill, with a wide and uninterrupted view of the plateau beneath", and Stratford's donation stipulated that the hospital would be "strictly non-sectarian" and "open to all citizens of the City of Brantford".

The hospital was expanded in 1910, and renamed "Brantford General Hospital".

A nurses' residence was added in 1948, and a school of nursing was founded in 1964.

In 1999, Brantford General Hospital partnered with The Willett Hospital in Paris, Ontario, to form the Brant Community Healthcare System (BCHS). The system serves one of the largest urban Indigenous populations in Canada, at nine percent. In 2017, the Canadian Institute for Health Information released data for the BCHS and Brantford showing it had the highest rate of opioid hospitalization in Ontario, and the highest rate of emergency visits due to opioid poisoning in Canada.
