= Stella-Maris-De-Kent Hospital =

- Vitalité Health Network
- Location in New Brunswick

Geography
- Location: 7714, Route 134, Sainte-Anne-de-Kent, Kent County, New Brunswick, Canada
- Coordinates: 46.55934°N 64.77972°W

Organization
- Type: Acute care

History
- Founded: 1947

Links
- Website: www.vitalitenb.ca/en/points-service/stella-maris-de-kent-hospital%20Stella-Maris-De-Kent%20Hospital
- Lists: Hospitals in Canada

Stella-Maris-De-Kent Hospital is a Canadian Catholic hospital located in the town of Sainte-Anne-de-Kent, New Brunswick.It is operated by Vitalité Health Network. It is an acute care community hospital and provides services to Kent County.

== See also ==
- List of hospitals in New Brunswick
