= Dr. Georges-L.-Dumont University Hospital Centre =

- Vitalité Health Network
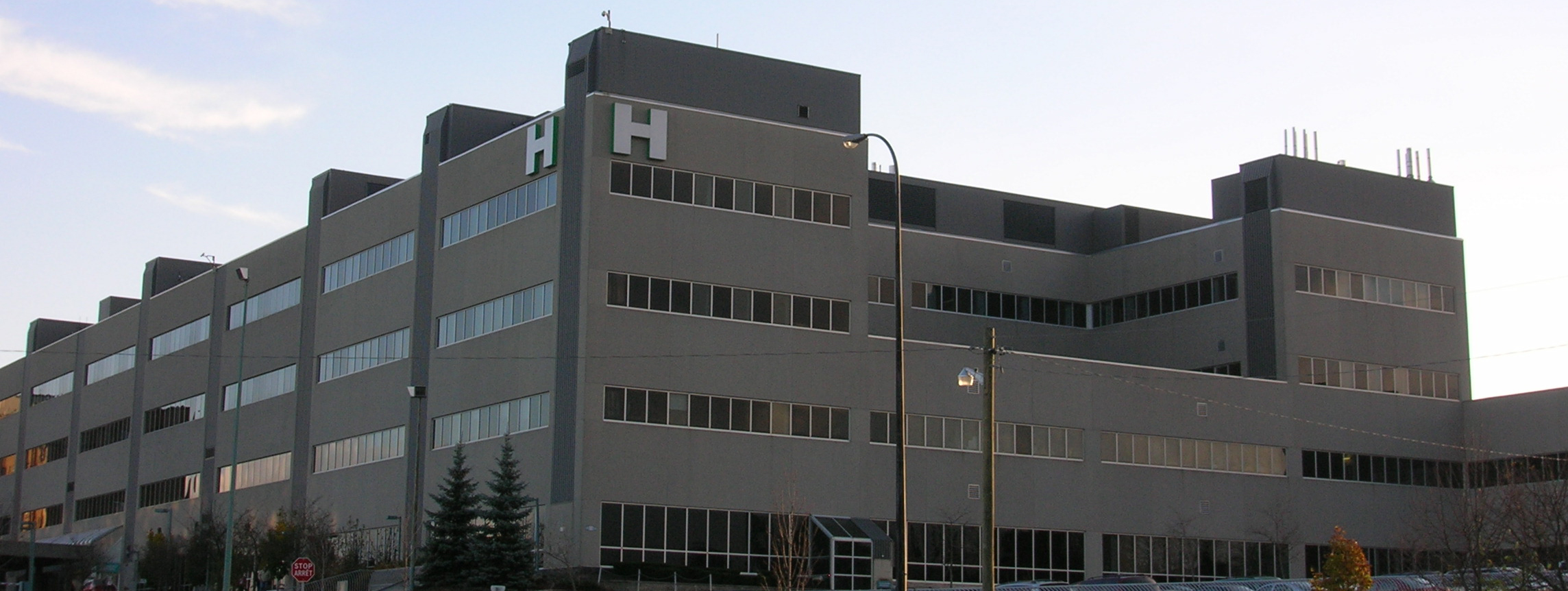
- The Dr. Georges-L.-Dumont University Hospital Centre

- Location in New Brunswick

Geography
- Location: 330 Avenue Université, Moncton, New Brunswick, Canada
- Coordinates: 46.0980°N 64.7871°W

Organization
- Care system: Public Medicare (Canada)
- Type: Teaching
- Affiliated university: Faculté de médecine – Université de Sherbrooke

Services
- Emergency department: Level III trauma centre
- Beds: 423
- Speciality: Oncology

History
- Founded: 1922

Links
- Website: Dr. Georges-L.-Dumont University Hospital Centre
- Lists: Hospitals in Canada

Dr. Georges-L.-Dumont University Hospital Centre is a hospital in Moncton, New Brunswick. It operates as a tertiary care referral hospital and specializes in oncology and trauma care services.

Operated by Vitalité Health Network, the Dr. Georges-L.-Dumont University Hospital Centre traces its history to 1922 with the establishment of the Hôtel-Dieu de l’Assomption by the Sisters of Providence. The hospital was purchased by the Government of New Brunswick in 1967 and renamed Dr. Georges-L. Dumont Regional Hospital in honour of Acadian doctor and late Minister of Health Georges Dumont. The facility was also designated the primary Francophone referral hospital in the province. In 1975 the present facility at 330 University Avenue was opened with a capacity at that time of 273 beds; subsequent expansions have resulted in the present capacity of over 400 beds

In 1992 Dr. Georges-L.-Dumont University Hospital Centre became a teaching hospital for the Faculté de médecine at Université de Sherbrooke in Sherbrooke, Quebec.

== History ==
- 1922 – At the request of Monsignor Henri Cormier, parish priest for the francophone community in Moncton, Sister Angèle-de-Brescia and three other nuns from the Montreal convent Sisters of Providence (Soeurs de la Providence) establish a 17-bed hospital called the Hôtel-Dieu de l'Assomption at 54–56 Church Street.
- 1928 – Official opening of the new Hôtel-Dieu on Providence Street with a capacity of 125 beds.
- 1930 – Foundation of the first medical board for the Hôtel-Dieu with Dr. Louis Napoléon Bourque as president. The first class graduates from the School of Nursing.
- 1952 – Creation of the first Advisory Committee for the Hôtel-Dieu with Mr. Calixte Savoie as president
- 1956 – The new wing of the Hôtel-Dieu is unveiled, bringing the hospital's capacity to 188 beds.
- 1967 – Purchase of the Hôtel-Dieu by the Province of New Brunswick. The Sisters of Providence (Soeurs de la Providence) leave after 45 years of service. The hospital is renamed the Dr. Georges-L.-Dumont Regional Hospital, in memory of a great Acadian doctor and Health Minister who died in 1966.
- 1974 – The Volunteer Association is founded in November with Ms. Rolande Basque as president.
- 1975 – Inauguration of the new Dr. Georges-L.-Dumont Regional Hospital with a capacity of 273 beds. The Hôtel-Dieu Pavilion is home to many medical and support services.
- 1977 – Confirmation of the role of the Dr. Georges-L. Dumont Regional Hospital as a regional hospital and referral centre for francophones throughout New Brunswick.
- 1981 – Establishment of a medical education department for students in training periods, interns and residents in medicine.
- 1989 – First annual campaign for the Tree of Hope.
- 1991 – Inauguration of a new wing, which brings the capacity of the hospital to 423 beds.
- 1992 – Creation of the Beauséjour Hospital Corporation to run the Dr. Georges-L.-Dumont Regional Hospital, the Stella-Maris-de-Kent Hospital and the Shediac Regional Medical Centre. The Dr. Georges-L.-Dumont Regional Hospital is designated as a teaching hospital, affiliated with the Faculty of Medicine of the Université de Sherbrooke.
- 1993 – The Dr. Léon-Richard Oncology Centre for cancer treatment opens.
- 1997 – The Providence School of Nursing (École d'enseignement infirmier Providence) closes after 70 years of existence and 1,331 graduates. 75th anniversary of the hospital's foundation and publication of a commemorative book by Claude Bourque entitled Rêves de visionnaires.
- 1998 – Following an agreement between the Beauséjour Hospital Corporation, the Université de Moncton and the New Brunswick Community College, Campbellton campus, a new Bachelor of Science degree in radiology is created, the first French-language program of its kind in Canada. Beauséjour Hospital Corporation created first provincial hospital research center, Institut de recherche médicale Beauséjour which became the Atlantic Cancer Research Institute.
- 1999 – The hospital is designated as the principal hospital for the VIIIth Francophone Summit (Sommet de la Francophonie).
- 2002 – The government of N.-B. replaces hospital corporations by regional health authorities. The Beauséjour Hospital Corporation is thus replaced by the Beauséjour Regional Health Authority.
- 2008 – Effective September 1, the province's eight regional health authorities are amalgamated into two new health authorities, namely the Vitalité Health Network (of which the Dr. Georges-L.-Dumont becomes a member, with the Head Office in Bathurst) and the Horizon Health Network.
- 2010 – Board of Directors of Vitalité Health Network announces during a public meeting that the Dr. Georges-L.-Dumont Regional Hospital has been officially designated as a university hospital centre (UHC) by the provincial government.
- 2011 – As of January 21, the Dr. Georges-L.-Dumont Regional Hospital is called the Dr. Georges-L.-Dumont University Hospital Centre. The University Hospital Centre is the flagship facility of Vitalité Health Network. The new name affirms the importance of the hospital within the Network, and its role in providing professional and academic health training in French in New Brunswick.
- 2016 – On November 18, construction begins on the New Brunswick Centre for Precision Medicine to open in 2018. This infrastructure is the first Hospital based Research Center in the province and is a partnership with Université de Moncton and Atlantic Cancer Research Institute.
- 2017 – On June 30, the hospital administrator says the hospital is chronically over-crowded, with occupancy at 120 percent of capacity, and announces it would henceforth be reviewing new admissions from outside the Moncton area; this announcement is since rescinded. It further announces it "cannot continue its regular activities and its mandate as a reference and teaching hospital."

== See also ==
- List of hospitals in New Brunswick
