= Hôpital Charles-LeMoyne =

Hôpital Charles-LeMoyne Charles LeMoyne Hospital
- CSSS Champlain—Charles-Le Moyne
- Location in Greater Montreal

Geography
- Location: 3120 Taschereau; Greenfield Park, Quebec, Canada
- Coordinates: 45.4971447°N 73.4866503°W

Organization
- Care system: RAMQ (Quebec medicare)
- Type: Teaching
- Affiliated university: Université de Sherbrooke Faculty of Medicine

Services
- Emergency department: Level I trauma centre
- Beds: 571
- Speciality: General

History
- Founded: 1966

Links
- Website: Official website
- Lists: Hospitals in Canada

The Charles LeMoyne Hospital (French: Hôpital Charles-LeMoyne, pronounced [opital ʃaʁl ləmwan]) is the major hospital in Longueuil, Quebec, Canada. It is located on Taschereau Boulevard in the borough of Greenfield Park opposite the borough of Saint-Hubert and in close proximity to the LeMoyne neighbourhood in the borough of Le Vieux-Longueuil. It also serves neighbouring cities on the south shore of Montreal. A teaching hospital affiliated with Université de Sherbrooke, the hospital is used to train students in medical school, nursing and other multidisciplinary programs.

The Charles LeMoyne Hospital is home to 3,000 employees, of which 1,500 are nurses, 500 are healthcare professionals and technicians, 325 are practicing doctors and specialists as well as 180 volunteers. It has an annual budget of over $200 million. It currently has 571 beds.

It is also the home to the Montérégie Comprehensive Cancer Care Centre (French: Centre intégré de cancérologie de la Montérégie) which was recently constructed. This was the first phase of a planned 3-phase hospital expansion project.
