= Queensway Carleton Hospital =

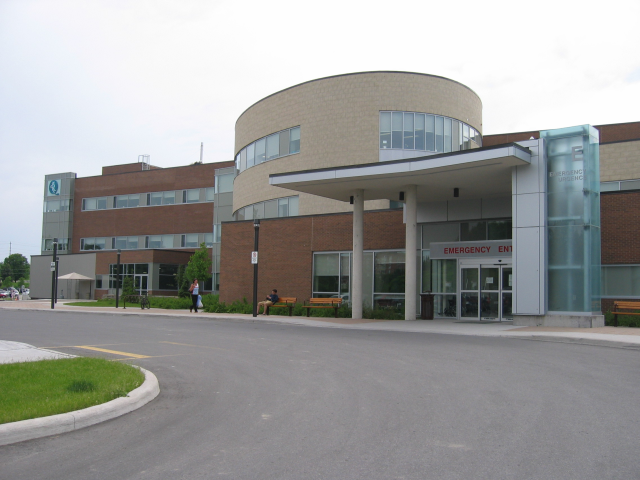

Geography
- Location: 3045 Baseline Road, Ottawa, Ontario, Canada
- Coordinates: 45°20′5.35″N 75°48′27.61″W

Organization
- Care system: Public Medicare (Canada) (OHIP)
- Type: General

Services
- Emergency department: Yes
- Beds: 355

Helipads
- Helipad: No

History
- Founded: 1976

Links
- Website: www.qch.on.ca
- Lists: Hospitals in Canada

Queensway Carleton Hospital (QCH) is a 355-bed hospital located in the west end of Ottawa, Ontario, Canada that delivers acute care and is west Ottawa's only full-service hospital.

QCH was officially opened on October 5, 1976, by then Ontario Premier William Davis and currently serves a population of more than 500,000 and is the secondary referral center for the Ottawa Valley. QCH focuses on its cornerstone health care programs: emergency, childbirth, Geriatric, mental health, rehabilitation, medical and surgical, and critical care.

In 2015 QCH obtained its "Accreditation with Exemplary Standing" from Accreditation Canada, the highest award level of accreditation with an overall compliance score of 99.4 (2014/2026 compliant standards) and meeting all 31/31 Required Organizational Practices.

The executive management team is led by President and chief executive officer Dr. Andrew Falconer and the medical team reports to Chief of Staff Dr. Katalin Kovacs. Dr. Falconer replaced Tom Schonberg who died in February 2019.

== Operational funding ==
QCH is funded by the Ontario Ministry of Health and Long-Term Care (a ministry of the Ontario Government), the QCH Foundation as well as by a variety of public and individual donations.

== By the numbers (2021–2022) ==
- Services:
  - Emergency visits – 80,045
  - Day stay surgeries – 16,004
  - Surgical inpatients – 2,814
  - Medical inpatients – 5,641
  - Mental Health patients – 12,686
  - Rehabilitation outpatient visits – 16,845
  - Rehabilitation inpatients – 610
  - Births – 2,473
  - Clinic & day program visits – 86,846
  - Diagnostic Imaging tests – 138,382
  - Cardiopulmonary procedures – 59,836
- Personnel:
  - 2528 Employees
  - 350 Physicians
  - 990 Nurses
  - 136 Volunteers

== Expansion ==
In 1986, QCH's first expansion took place from the original 1976 building, adding an additional 160 acute care beds, ambulatory care services, diagnostic imaging services, and additional administrative space.

Between 1998 and 2000, in response to provincial hospital restructuring and amalgamation of services, QCH completed Phase 1 of its expansion, which included a new birthing centre, which included the incorporation of the former Grace Hospital's Newborn Program and an expanded diagnostic imaging program, which included QCH's first CT scanner.

Between 2003 and 2005, Phase 2 of the expansion was approved to allow for significant growth in the emergency department, the busiest single-site emergency department in Eastern Ontario with almost 78,000 visits yearly in 2017; in-patient medicine; and surgery units, ICU and surgery capacity; and incremental growth in other clinical and support areas.

Between 2008 and 2010, in partnership with Cancer Care Ontario and The Ottawa Hospital Regional Cancer Center Program, the Irving Greenberg Family Cancer Center (IGFCC) was opened on the QCH campus to provide cancer diagnosis, treatment, surgery and ambulatory support. The facility includes 3x radiation treatment machines, 2x clinics and 33x chemotherapy spaces. The first patients were treated in April 2010.

In 2012, a ten-year Phase 3 expansion project was completed to provide the following improvements: 10 new Operating Room suites, a new and expanded Ambulatory Care Centre, a new Rehabilitation Centre, a new Physiotherapy Centre and a 15-station Hemodialysis unit. The 140,000 sq ft expansion also included renovations to the pharmacy and laboratory departments and significantly expanded the diagnostic imaging department, doubling the number of MRI and CT scanners and additional nuclear medicine and biopsy units.

In 2014, Ontario Premier Kathleen Wynne and Minister of Energy Bob Chiarelli announced the approval of a new 34-bed Acute Care of the Elderly (ACE) Unit at QCH. The $9.6 million project addresses the special needs of geriatric patients and will help prepare elderly patients for a smooth transition to home. The unit will be only the second of its kind in Ontario after Mount Sinai Hospital in Toronto.

The original 1976 QCH structures covered 240,000 sq ft; after multiple phases of expansion and investment in 1986, 1998, 2005, 2008, 2009 and 2012, QCH now covers 680,000 sq ft.

== In fiction ==
In fiction, The hospital was mentioned in the episode The Smile in “Homeland” where the character Carrie Mathison, received a temporary new identity, “Kate Morrissey”, for a CIA mission, with one of the facts of Morrissey being born in the hospital. However, the hospital did not have a maternity ward at the time of her birth and her place of birth is incorrectly listed as Ottawa when at that time the hospital within Nepean (before amalgamation of the city of Ottawa).
