= Centracare (hospital) =

- Horizon Health Network
- Location in New Brunswick

Geography
- Location: 414 Bay Street, Saint John, New Brunswick, Canada
- Coordinates: 45.2542°N 66.1265°W

Organization
- Care system: Public Medicare (Canada)
- Type: Psychiatric

Services
- Beds: 50

History
- Founded: 1835

Links
- Website: Centracare
- Lists: Hospitals in Canada

Centracare is a Canadian psychiatric hospital in Saint John, New Brunswick.

Operated by Horizon Health Network, it is a modern 50-bed tertiary care facility.

== History ==
Centracare's history can be traced to 1835 when the Provincial Lunatic Asylum was constructed at the corner of Wentworth and Leinster streets in "uptown" Saint John, making it the first mental health facility constructed in British North America. Its first director was Dr. George Peters who served from 1835 to 1848.

Ground was broken in 1846 on a new facility to be constructed of stone to replace the aging wooden structure at Wentworth and Leinster. This new building was to occupy a commanding location in the neighbouring city of Lancaster, on a high bluff on the west bank of the Saint John River overlooking the Reversing Falls gorge which was immediately upstream. An infamous nearby road intersection at the west end of the Reversing Falls Bridge called "Simms Corner" (after the T.S. Simms & Co. Ltd. paint brush factory) was located on the north side of the property.

The first 90 patients moved into the building on December 12, 1848.

Dr. John Waddell served as director from 1849 to 1875, living for 26 years with his family in an apartment on the third floor of the building above the main entrance.

Dr. James T. Steeves took over the position as director and served from 1875 to 1895. The late 1870s saw tremendous growth in the number of patients being admitted, leading to overcrowding and turning away patients. The Great Fire of 1877 would have been easily viewed from the institution's location overlooking the city, however it was noted that this disaster did not have a significant effect upon the patients.

The building was modernized and living conditions improved during capital expenditures during the late 1870s that saw rooms painted and decorated, as well as the installation of dumbwaiters and elevators, hot water throughout the building, improved ventilation, water closets, and a central laundry service operating steam-heated washers and dryers. An 1878 addition (the first of five) was constructed to the building for housing male patients and a workshop was opened for them in 1880. In 1881 an addition was constructed for female patients which helped to relieve overcrowding concerns.

The hospital contained 15 wards which separated men from women, as well as paying patients from non-paying patients and by varying degrees of severity of illness. Able-bodied patients were expected to work in the building's laundry or clean various parts of the facility in order to pay for their stay. The Annex Farm opened on the Sand Cove Road in southern Lancaster, overlooking the Bay of Fundy in 1885 and many residents worked there as well.

Dr. George A Hetherington served as director from 1896 to 1903 and oversaw improvements to the property's exterior, including various walkways, pathways and gardens of the Asylum as part of a project to encourage patients to do more outdoor activities. He was also an advocate of hydrotherapy and led the Asylum through various implementations of this form of treatment.

Dr. James Vickers Anglin was the longest serving director of the Asylum from 1904 to 1934 and lived in the director's third floor apartment with his wife and five children. In his first year as director, the institution changed its name to the Provincial Hospital of Nervous Diseases. He oversaw numerous capital improvements including repainting of rooms, a new heating system, hardwood floors throughout the building's living and common areas, as well as the installation of electricity and lighting. Patient overcrowding during the 1920s, possibly as a result of New Brunswick veterans returning from World War I, led to another addition constructed in 1927–1929 which saw two new wards, a kitchen and storeroom built.

A 1934 report indicated that from the institution's opening in 1849, it had treated 11,796 patients, of which 4,708 were discharged and "fully recovered".

Dr. E.C. Menzies served as director from 1934 to 1956 and oversaw ongoing capital improvements to the wards and treatment facilities, including the construction and installation of an operating room, X-ray department and sterilizing equipment in 1936; prior to this, patients had to be transferred to the General Hospital. World War II saw a shortage of staff in trained doctors, nurses and ward attendants. An electroencephalogram was installed in 1951. The facility also purchased various residential properties along nearby Lancaster Avenue to serve as housing for the institution's staff.

The hospital experienced severe overcrowding during the late 1940s and early 1950s as the number of patients increased dramatically following the war when soldiers were repatriated to New Brunswick. Consequently, the provincial government decided to fund the province's second psychiatric hospital, the Restigouche Hospital which opened its doors in 1954 in Campbellton.

In 1955, the provincial government studied replacing the Saint John facility with a new building on the property occupied by the Annex Farm; the farm property had been expanded by 100 acres (40 ha) in 1945. The proposed facility replacement project was cancelled in 1958 with a change in government.

In December 1956, the hospital recorded the highest number of patients in its history with 1,697 having been admitted.

Dr. Robert A. Gregory served as director from 1956 to 1969, followed by Dr. Ihsan Kapkin from 1969 to 1971. In 1970 the Provincial Hospital Annex (also known as the Provincial Hospital Farm) was sold to the private sector.

Dr. Allan Robertson was the director of the institution from 1973 to 1977 and led efforts to convince the provincial government to replace the facility with more modern infrastructure. This period also saw considerable debate in the government led by Premier Richard Hatfield over what to do about modernizing community care for the mentally ill.

Dr. H. Leonard Sussman served as director from 1977 to 1978, followed by Dr. John A. Finley from 1978 to 1981, Dr. J. C. Theriault from 1981 to 1983, Dr. Pierre Deom from 1985 to 1986 and Dr. James Millar from 1986 to 1995.

In 1985 the New Brunswick Mental Health Commission was established as the first of several steps in modernizing and de-centralizing institutional care in the province. At this time the institution was renamed Centracare. In 1992, Centracare came under the administration of the Region 2 Hospital Corporation, later renamed the Atlantic Health Sciences Corporation which was the health authority charged with administering hospitals and health care facilities across southwestern New Brunswick.

In January 1996, it was decided by AHSC to change the focus of Centracare from a facility-oriented view to a program-oriented view. Linda Nice was appointed director and funding was secured from the provincial government for a replacement residential care facility while plans were made to demolish the original institution in Lancaster (now part of the city of Saint John). In April 1997 a $4.4 million (CAD) tender was issued to construct the new 50-bed psychiatric hospital in suburban South Bay.

The new facility opened in the spring of 1998 and provides tertiary level psychogeriatric and psychosocial rehabilitation services and is the focal point of AHSC's mental health care that also includes psychiatric services at the Saint John Regional Hospital and through various Community Mental Health Clinics.

The massive 150-year-old original Centracare property in Lancaster, which was first called the Provincial Lunatic Asylum, had been purchased from the provincial government by industrial conglomerate J.D. Irving Limited for $1 million (CAD) in 1998. The building was vacated after the last 48 patients were moved from the building in the spring of 1998 to Centracare's new psychiatric hospital at South Bay.

J.D. Irving began the massive demolition of the vacant psychiatric hospital in Lancaster on March 9, 1999, and the entire structure was levelled within days. Some of the rubble was used to fill the basement while the rest was hauled away to a nearby construction and demolition landfill. The site was then hydroseeded and the property has been turned into a privately owned but publicly accessed urban park named Wolastoq Park administered by J.D. Irving Ltd. The park has views of the Reversing Falls gorge and the Saint John skyline.
