= Moncton Hospital =

The Moncton Hospital
- Horizon Health Network
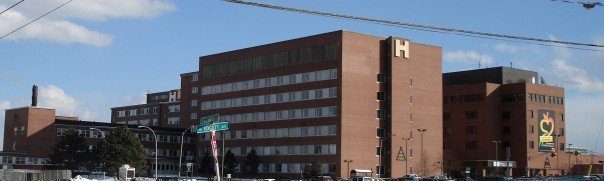

- Location in New Brunswick

Geography
- Location: 135 MacBeath Avenue, Moncton, New Brunswick, Canada
- Coordinates: 46.1054°N 64.8051°W

Organization
- Care system: Medicare
- Type: Teaching
- Affiliated university: Dalhousie University Faculty of Medicine

Services
- Emergency department: Level II trauma centre
- Beds: 381
- Speciality: Neurosurgery

History
- Founded: 1895

Links
- Website: The Moncton Hospital

The Moncton Hospital is a hospital in Moncton, New Brunswick.

The Moncton Hospital operates as a tertiary care referral hospital for New Brunswick, as well as neighbouring regions of northeastern Nova Scotia (Cumberland County) and the province of Prince Edward Island. It has specialization in neurosurgery and trauma care services.

Operated by Horizon Health Network, the Moncton Hospital traces its history to 1895. The Moncton Hospital is also a teaching hospital for the Faculty of Medicine at Dalhousie University in Halifax, Nova Scotia.

== Services ==
- Addictions and Psychiatry
- Clinical Services
  - Day surgery
  - Dermatology
  - Ear, Nose & Throat (Otolaryngology)
  - Emergency Department
  - Family Medicine
  - General Surgery
  - Gynecology Surgery
  - Gastroenterology
  - Geriatrics / Restorative Care
  - Intensive Care Unit (ICU)
  - Internal Medicine
  - Neurology
  - Neurosurgery
  - Neonatal Intensive Care Unit (NICU)
  - Minor Surgery
  - Obstetrics
  - Oncology
  - Ophthalmology (Eye) Surgery
  - Orthopedic Surgery
  - Plastic Surgery
  - Pediatric Intensive Care Unit
  - Drug rehabilitation
  - Physical medicine and rehabilitation
  - Rheumatology
  - Thoracic Surgery
  - Urology Surgery
  - Vascular Surgery
- Support and Therapy
- Diagnostics and Testing
- Clinics
- Other Services

== See also ==
- Greater Moncton
- List of hospitals in New Brunswick
