= Faculté de médecine – Université de Sherbrooke =

Medical school in Quebec, Canada

Faculté de médecine et des sciences de la santé
- Type: Medical School
- Established: 1966
- Affiliations: Université de Sherbrooke
- Location: Sherbrooke, Québec, Canada; 45°26′52″N 71°52′07″W
- Website: www.usherbrooke.ca/medecine/faculte/direction

The Faculté de médecine et des sciences de la santé is one of four medical schools in the Canadian province of Quebec. The faculty is part of the Université de Sherbrooke and is located in Sherbrooke, Quebec, southeast of Montreal.

== See also ==
- Centre hospitalier universitaire de Sherbrooke
