= St. Mary's Hospital (Montreal) =

Hospital in Montreal, Quebec, Canada

- CIUSSS de l'Ouest-de-L’Île-de-Montréal
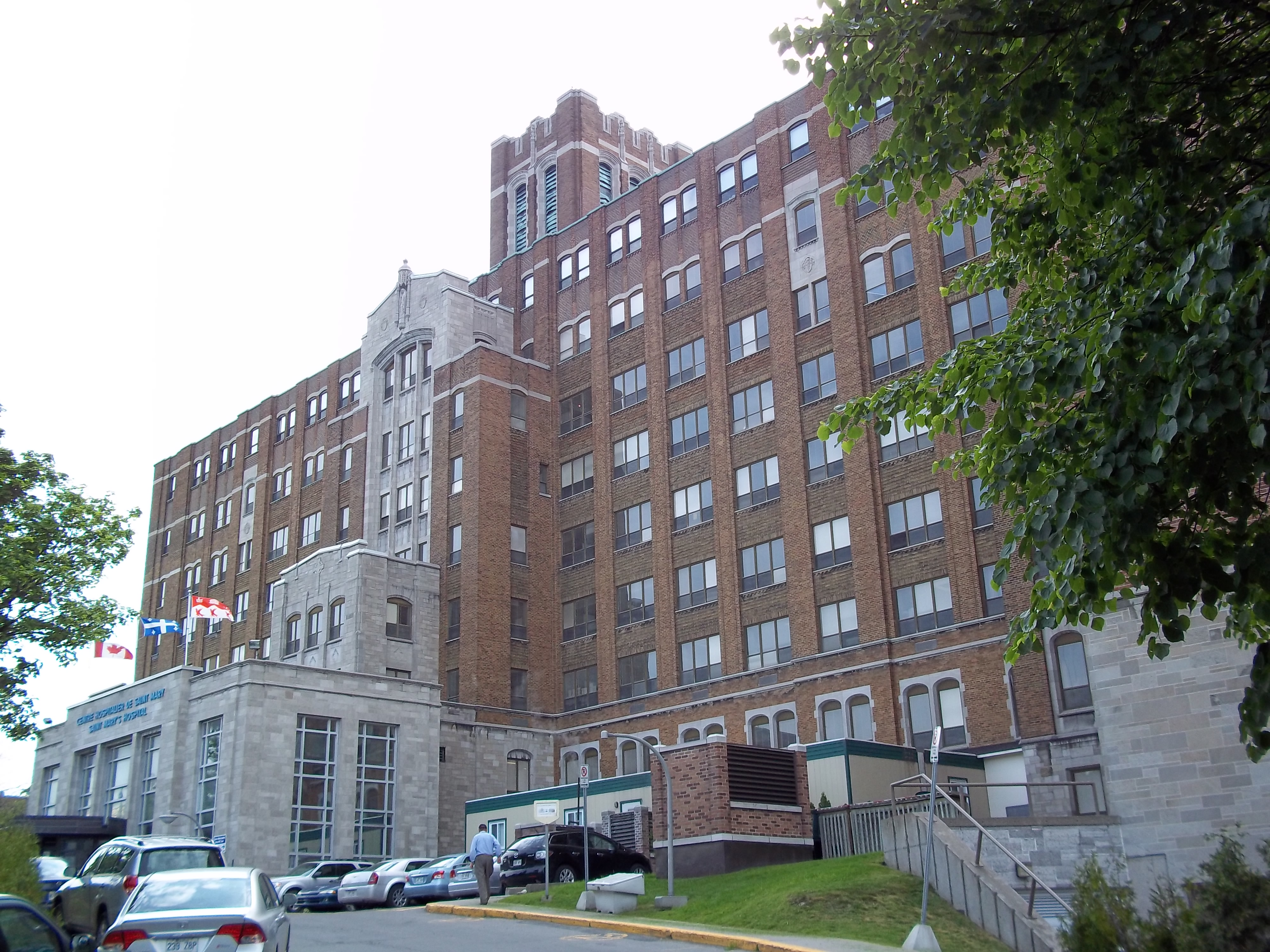

- Location in Montreal

Geography
- Location: 3830, avenue Lacombe; Montreal, Quebec, Canada; H3T 1M5
- Coordinates: 45.494722°N 73.624167°W

Organisation
- Care system: RAMQ (Quebec medicare)
- Type: Teaching
- Affiliated university: McGill University Faculty of Medicine

Services
- Emergency department: Yes
- Beds: 271
- Speciality: Oncology, General surgery

History
- Founded: 1924

Links
- Website: http://www.smhc.qc.ca/en/

St. Mary's Hospital (French: Centre hospitalier de St-Mary) is a hospital located in Montreal, Quebec, Canada. Affiliated with McGill University's medicine programs, St. Mary's is an independent teaching hospital. The hospital is located at 3830 Lacombe Avenue in the borough of Côte-des-Neiges–Notre-Dame-de-Grâce. Serving a very ethnically diverse community, staff members are able to communicate in over 30 different languages. St. Mary's is an integral part of the Réseau universitaire intégré de santé (RUIS) McGill.

== History ==
St. Mary's Hospital was founded in 1924 by Sister Helen Morrissey and Dr. Donald A. Hingston. First a 45-bed institution located at Shaughnessy House (now the Canadian Centre for Architecture) in the Shaughnessy Village neighbourhood of Downtown Montreal, it has since moved to its current location in 1934 where it has 271 beds.
