= Horizon Health Network =

Health authority in New Brunswick, Canada

- Company type: Health Care
- Industry: Health care
- Founded: September 1, 2008
- Founder: Government of New Brunswick
- Headquarters: Fredericton, New Brunswick
- Area served: New Brunswick
- Key people: President & CEO Margaret Melanson; Minister of Health; Board of Directors
- Number of employees: 13,000 (2010)
- Website: horizonnb.ca

Horizon Health Network (French: Réseau de santé Horizon) is one of two health authorities in the Canadian province of New Brunswick, the other being Vitalité Health Network.

Horizon Health Network delivers medical care on behalf of the Government of New Brunswick to the central and southern portions of the province through 12 hospitals and 28 health centres/clinics while providing a variety of programs and services.

Horizon Health Network is headquartered in Fredericton, New Brunswick.

== Hospitals ==
Horizon Health Network operates the following hospitals:

- Charlotte County Hospital (St. Stephen, NB)
- Dr. Everett Chalmers Regional Hospital (Fredericton, NB)
- Grand Manan Hospital (North Head, NB on Grand Manan Island)
- Hotel-Dieu of St. Joseph (Perth-Andover, NB)
- Miramichi Regional Hospital (Miramichi, NB)
- Oromocto Public Hospital (Oromocto, NB)
- Sackville Memorial Hospital (Sackville, NB)
- Saint John Regional Hospital (Saint John, NB)
- St. Joseph's Hospital (Saint John, NB)
- Sussex Health Centre (Sussex, NB)
- The Moncton Hospital (Moncton, NB)
- Upper River Valley Hospital (Waterville, NB)

== Language policy ==
The internal working language of the Horizon Health Network is English, while the Vitalité Health Network functions in French. However, each network provides service to the public in both official languages.

== Quick facts ==
- Horizon Health serves the province of New Brunswick but through inter-provincial agreements, also provides referral services for part of northeastern Nova Scotia (Cumberland County) as well as Prince Edward Island
- It is one of the largest employers in New Brunswick
- It is the second largest health authority in Atlantic Canada
- It is a more than $1.4 billion organization
- It has approximately 14,000 staff members and 1,242 physicians
- It has over 100 facilities, clinics and offices
- It has 3,500 volunteers, auxiliary and alumnae members
- It operates 17 foundations
- It has 16 auxiliaries and alumnae
- There are 370 medical residents and 6,000 placements for students from various nursing, medical and health care programs
- The board of directors has seven members, appointed by the Minister of Health

== Statistics (2010–2011) ==
Number of

- medical residents – 370
- hospitals – 12
- hospital beds – 1,600
- admissions – 55,000 (acute, rehab and chronic)
- inpatient days – 580,000 (acute, rehab and chronic)
- surgeries completed per year – 45,000
- births – 5,400
