= Waterville, Carleton County, New Brunswick =

Coordinates: 46°16′4.5″N 67°34′52.5″W

Waterville is a Canadian rural community in Carleton County, New Brunswick on Route 590.

== History ==
In 1866, Waterville was a town mostly devoted to farming and lumber, with a population of around 60 families. By 1871 the town had a population of 500, though this had shrunk down to 150 by 1898.

== Geography ==
Waterville is a community located in Wakefield Parish in Carleton County, New Brunswick, Canada. It is located on Route 590. There are three separate settlements: Central Waterville, Upper Waterville, and Lower Waterville. At one time there were also two additional settlements named Rockwell and Walton.

== See also ==
- List of communities in New Brunswick
