= Vitalité Health Network =

Health authority in New Brunswick, Canada

- Company type: Health care
- Industry: Health care
- Founded: September 6, 2008
- Founder: Government of New Brunswick
- Headquarters: Bathurst, New Brunswick
- Area served: New Brunswick
- Key people: Minister of Health; Health Board; President & CEO
- Number of employees: 7,497 (2013–2014)
- Website: www.vitalitenb.ca.

Vitalité Health Network (French: Réseau de santé Vitalité) is one of two health authorities in the Canadian province of New Brunswick, the other being Horizon Health Network.

Vitalité Health Network delivers medical care on behalf of the Government of New Brunswick's Department of Health to the northern and southeastern portions of the province through 11 hospitals and 30 health centres/clinics and provides a variety of programs and services.

Vitalité Health Network is headquartered in Bathurst, New Brunswick.

== Hospitals ==
Vitalité Health Network operates the following hospitals:

- Dr. Georges-L.-Dumont University Hospital Centre (Moncton, NB)
- Chaleur Regional Hospital (Bathurst, NB)
- Hôpital de l'Enfant-Jésus (Caraquet, NB)
- Tracadie-Sheila Hospital (Tracadie–Sheila, NB)
- Campbellton Regional Hospital (Campbellton, NB)
- Restigouche Hospital Centre (Campbellton, NB)
- St. Joseph Community Health Centre (Dalhousie, NB)
- Edmundston Regional Hospital (Edmundston, NB)
- Grand Falls General Hospital (Grand Falls, NB)
- Hôtel-Dieu Saint-Joseph de Saint-Quentin (Saint-Quentin, NB)
- Stella-Maris-De-Kent Hospital (Sainte-Anne-de-Kent, NB)

== Language policy ==
The internal working language of the Vitalité Health Network is French, while the Horizon Health Network functions in English. However, each network provides service to the public in both official languages.

== Former health authorities ==
Vitalité Health Network was established by the provincial government effective September 1, 2008 through the dissolution and merger of the following health authorities:

- Beauséjour Regional Health Authority
- Acadie-Bathurst Health Authority
- Restigouche Health Authority
- Regional Health Authority 4

== Quick facts ==
- Vitalité Health serves the province of New Brunswick both through inter-provincial and international agreements, also provides referral services for part of northeastern Maine (Aroostook County) as well as Quebec's Gaspé Peninsula (through hospitals in Edmundston and Campbellton)
- One of the largest employers in New Brunswick
- Annual budget approximately $660 million
- Approximately 7,600 staff members and 470 physicians
- Over 70 facilities, clinics and offices
- 1,200 volunteers, auxiliary and alumnae members
- 9 foundations

== Statistics (2013 - 2014) ==
Number of:

- beds 1,197
- patient days 387,476
- surgeries 20,798
- emergency room visits 249,041
- births 1,780
- Extra-Mural Program visits 182, 638
