= UBC Faculty of Medicine =

Public medical school in British Columbia, Canada

- Type: Public medical school
- Established: 1950; 76 years ago
- Parent institution: University of British Columbia
- Dean: Dermot Kelleher
- Academic staff: 6,736
- Students: 2,861
- Location: Vancouver, Kelowna, Victoria, and Prince George, British Columbia, Canada
- Website: med.ubc.ca

The UBC Faculty of Medicine is the medical school of the University of British Columbia. It is one of 18 medical schools in Canada and the first one in the province of British Columbia. It has Canada's largest undergraduate medical education program and the fifth-largest in the U.S. and Canada. It is ranked as the 2nd best medical program in Canada by Maclean's, and 27th in the world by the 2017 QS World University Rankings.

== History ==
The Faculty of Medicine was established in 1950 in Vancouver, taking in 60 medical students under the leadership of its first dean, Myron Weaver. The size of its incoming medical classes was increased to 80 students in 1972, 120 students in 1980, and 128 students in 2000. Starting in 2004, the medical program began a gradual expansion that more than doubled enrolment and distributed medical education and training at campuses, hospitals and clinics throughout the province. The size of incoming medical classes grew to 288, with one-third of those students spending most of their four years at one of three distributed sites in northern British Columbia, the B.C. Interior or Vancouver Island. The size and geographic scope of the Faculty of Medicine's 71 medical residency programs also grew correspondingly.

Since its founding, the Faculty has added other educational programs, including physical therapy, occupational science and occupational therapy, audiology and speech sciences, midwifery, and population and public health. The men's mental health resource HeadsUpGuys was launched as a program of the faculty in 2015.

In January 2021, Peter Berman, the head of the medical faculty's School of Population and Public Health apologized after taking an international vacation to Hawaii over the holiday season contrary to public health advice to avoid international travel during the COVID-19 pandemic. After his trip was reported on, Berman said that he regrets not having made the same sacrifices as everyone else and stated his support for public health authorities.

== Research ==
Most research by the UBC Faculty of Medicine is conducted under the auspices of six institutes and 15 centres that are part of UBC or affiliated with it. Some researchers are based at UBC's Vancouver campus, though many work in the Faculty of Medicine's affiliated hospitals, especially in Vancouver: Vancouver General Hospital, the BC Cancer Agency, St. Paul's Hospital, BC Women's Hospital + Health Centre and BC Children's Hospital.

Members of the Faculty of Medicine are responsible for 132 patents issued or filed, and the creation of six spin-off companies. The Faculty of Medicine has more than 300 postdoctoral fellows and almost 600 PhD students. The Faculty of Medicine had one Nobel laureate, Professor of Biochemistry Michael Smith, who received the 1993 Nobel Prize in Chemistry for his work in developing site-directed mutagenesis. Smith also received the Canada Gairdner International Award in 1986. Two members of the Faculty have received the Canada Gairdner Wightman Award: James C. Hogg (2013) and Michael Hayden (2011). Julio Montaner has received several awards for demonstrating the effectiveness of Highly Active Antiretroviral Therapy (HAART) in the treatment of HIV infection, and championing the "Treatment as Prevention" strategy for controlling the spread of the disease.
