= CAK7 =

CAK7 may refer to:

- B.C. Women's Hospital & Health Centre
- British Columbia's Children's Hospital
