= Robert Andrew Holt =

Robert Holt (born July 22, 1968 in New Westminster, BC, Canada) is a genomic scientist and immunogeneticist. He is currently a Distinguished Scientific at the BC Cancer Research Centre, where he is also Co-Director of the BC Cancer Immunotherapy program (in Vancouver, Canada). He is also appointed as Professor of Medical Genetics at the University of British Columbia and Professor of Molecular Biology & Biochemistry at Simon Fraser University. Through international consortia, he has had made several significant contributions to science (e.g. The Cancer Genome Atlas, The Human Microbiome Project, Cancer Research UK Grand Challenges). After initial sequencing of the Drosophila and human genomes was co-PI on the NIH program to sequence the rat genome, and was also a PI on the international effort to sequence the malaria mosquito genome, which involved >30 principal scientists from 11 different countries. With his publications exceeding over 200 and his citations being recorded approximately 70,000 times, Holt earned a position in the top 1% of Web of Science cited researchers by Clarivate Analytics in 2018 and 2019.

== Education ==
After earning an undergraduate degree (BSc) in General Science from the University of British Columbia in 1992, he studied neuroscience and pharmacology under the supervision of Drs. Ian L. Martin and Alan N. Bateson at the University of Alberta and graduated with a PhD in Pharmacology in 1998. His thesis focused on the molecular characterization of GABA-A receptors. He undertook postdoctoral research at the State University of New York in Albany with Dr. Caro-Beth Stewart, where he used rapid DNA sequencing techniques to study molecular evolution in primates.

== Career ==
Throughout his undergraduate and graduate studies, for several months each year, he worked in the silviculture industry in northern British Columbia. After his brief postdoctoral research program he joined Dr. Craig Venter's team at Celera Genomics, as the production manager for DNA sequencing operations. He was a leading figure actualizing industrial-scale molecular biology and established, at the time, the world's largest DNA sequencing center. Upon his return to Canada, he joined the Michael Smith Genome Sciences Centre (GSC), a world-leading genome center with >300 personnel, at the BC Cancer Research Centre. He served as head of sequencing and co-director (with Dr. Marco Marra) of the Genome Canada Innovation Network GSC node from 2005 to 2016. Together with Medical Director A. Karsan, he established the first College of American Pathologists-accredited clinical next generation sequencing (NGS) platform in Canada.

He joined the faculty of the University of British Columbia in 2003 where he is now a professor in the Department of Medical Genetics, a faculty member of the Genome Science and Technology program, the Interdisciplinary Oncology Graduate Program, the Genetics Graduate Program and the Health Brain Research Centre. He is also a professor in the Molecular Biology and Biochemistry Department at Simon Fraser University.

Moreover, together with Dr. Brad Nelson, he is currently scientific co-director of the BC Cancer Immunotherapy program. With Dr. John Bell (Univ. of Ottawa) and others he launched BioCanRx, a Networks of Centres of Excellence program focused on cancer biotherapeutics. He serves as overall PI for a team of basic and clinical scientists in BC and Ontario that has established domestic CAR-T manufacturing capacity and launched the first investigator-initiated, self-sponsored CAR-T clinical trial in Canada "CLIC-01" laying the groundwork for new CAR-T innovations in Canada.

== Research ==
His lab described the link between an emerging pathogen, Fusobacterium nucleatum (Fn), and colorectal cancer. This finding (named by TIME magazine as one of the top 10 medical breakthroughs for 2011) has been extensively replicated and its significance has gained a global renown. He leads one of six work-packages in a newly awarded Cancer Research UK Grand Challenges grant where their international team will interrogate Fn biology comprehensively in global cohorts and model systems.

His group pioneered decoding immune repertoire by deep sequencing, opening a fast-developing field encompassing numerous biotechnology companies, holding international meetings and establishing a scientific society mainly focused on this methodology. Their work also profiled T-lymphocyte antigens, as well. They led the way to develop an NGS assembly algorithm and succeeded in extracting Human Leukocyte Antigen (HLA) types from NGS data sets. These methods have been utilized by themselves and by the community in recent high impact studies. They were also the first to show that the anti-cancer immune response is linked to mutational antigen (neoantigen) load. Neoantigens are now being thoroughly scrutinized as targets for cancer immunotherapy and are implicated in the achievements of the new blockbuster checkpoint blockade therapies.
