= Michael Smith (chemist) =

Canadian biochemist, businessman and Nobel Prize laureate (1932–2000)

Michael Smith CC OBC FRS
- Born: 26 April 1932; Blackpool, England
- Died: 4 October 2000 (aged 68); Vancouver, British Columbia, Canada
- Education: University of Manchester (BSc, PhD)
- Known for: Site-directed mutagenesis
- Awards: Flavelle Medal (1992); Nobel Prize in Chemistry (1993)
- Scientific career
- Fields: Chemistry
- Workplaces: University of British Columbia; University of Wisconsin–Madison
- Thesis: Studies in the stereochemistry of diols and their derivatives (1956)

Michael Smith (April 26, 1932 – October 4, 2000) was a British-Canadian biochemist and businessman. He shared the 1993 Nobel Prize in Chemistry with Kary Mullis for his work in developing site-directed mutagenesis. Following a PhD in 1956 from the University of Manchester, he undertook postdoctoral research with Har Gobind Khorana (himself a Nobel Prize winner) at the British Columbia Research Council in Vancouver, British Columbia, Canada. Subsequently, Smith worked at the Fisheries Research Board of Canada Laboratory in Vancouver before being appointed a professor of biochemistry in the UBC Faculty of Medicine in 1966. Smith's career included roles as the founding director of the UBC Biotechnology Laboratory (1987 to 1995) and the founding scientific leader of the Protein Engineering Network of Centres of Excellence (PENCE). In 1996 he was named Peter Wall Distinguished Professor of Biotechnology. Subsequently, he became the founding director of the Genome Sequencing Centre (now called the Michael Smith Genome Sciences Centre) at the BC Cancer Research Centre.

== Education and early life ==
Smith was born April 26, 1932, in Blackpool, Lancashire, England. He immigrated to Canada in 1956 and became a Canadian citizen in 1963. Smith married Helen Wood Christie on August 6, 1960, on Vancouver Island, BC, Canada. The couple had three children (Tom, Ian and Wendy) and three grandchildren, but separated in 1983. In his later years, Smith lived with his partner Elizabeth Raines in Vancouver until his death on October 4, 2000.

Smith first attended St. Nicholas Church of England School, a state-run elementary school. At the time, few children from state schools in England went on to further academic education, however Smith did well in the eleven plus exam, and was an exception. A scholarship enabled him to attend the Arnold School for Boys. A further scholarship allowed him to study Chemistry at the University of Manchester, where he pursued his interest in industrial chemistry and was awarded a BSc followed by a PhD in 1956 for research into the stereochemistry of diols.

== Career ==
=== Researcher ===
Smith's research career began with a post-doctoral fellowship at the British Columbia Research Council under the supervision of Khorana, who was developing new techniques of synthesizing nucleotides. The application of principles of physics and chemistry to living organisms was new at that time; DNA had been identified as the genetic material of a cell, and Khorana and others were investigating how DNA encoded the proteins that constituted an organism. In 1960, when Khorana was offered and accepted a university position with excellent laboratory facilities in the Institute for Enzyme Research at the University of Wisconsin–Madison, Smith moved with him.

After a few months in Wisconsin, Smith returned to Vancouver as a senior scientist and head of the Chemistry Division with the Vancouver Technological Station of the Fisheries Research Board (FRB) of Canada. In this role he conducted studies on the feeding habits and survival of spawning salmon, as well as identification of olfactory stimuli guiding salmon to their birth stream. His main research interest, however, continued to be nucleic acid synthesis, for which he received a United States Public Health Service Research Grant.

Concurrently with conducting research for FRB, Smith held the positions of associate professor at the University of British Columbia's (UBC) Department of Biochemistry and honorary professor in the Department of Zoology. In 1966, Smith was appointed a research associate of the Medical Research Council of Canada, working within UBC's Department of Biochemistry.

Smith's particular area of interest remained the synthesis of oligonucleotides and the characterization of their properties. In 1975–1976, a sabbatical at the MRC Laboratory of Molecular Biology in England with Fred Sanger placed Smith at the forefront of research into the organization of genes and genomes and methods of sequencing large DNA molecules. He returned from England as one of the world's leading molecular biologists.

Smith and his team began to investigate possibility of the creation of mutations of any site within a viral genome. If possible, this process could be an efficient method to engineer heritable changes in genes. Finally, in 1977 they confirmed Smith's theory.

==== Site-specific mutagenesis ====
In the late 1970s, Smith concentrated on projects in molecular biology and how the genes within the DNA molecule act as reservoirs and transmitters of biological information. In 1978, Smith, in collaboration with former Fred Sanger lab sabbatical colleague Clyde A. Hutchison III, introduced a new technique known as "oligonucleotide-directed site-directed mutagenesis" into molecular biology, resolving the problem of how to efficiently determine the effect of a single mutant gene. They developed a synthetic DNA technique for introducing site-specific mutations into genes. This permitted comparison of different protein molecules, revealing the role of the initial mutation.

The new technology enabled rapid identification and deliberate alteration of genes for the purpose of changing the characteristics of an organism. It raised the level of possibility of new diagnostic strategies and new treatments for genetic diseases, and even creation of novel artificial forms of life, as the progenitor technique for polymerase chain reaction (PCR), Site-Directed Mutagenesis and Synthetic Biology.

The team's paper describing site-directed mutagenesis was published as "Mutagenesis at a Specific Position in a DNA Sequence" in the Journal of Biological Chemistry in 1978. For the team's work in developing oligonucleotide-directed site-directed mutagenesis, Smith shared the 1993 Nobel Prize in Chemistry with Kary Mullis, the inventor of PCR.

Using site-directed mutagenesis, scientists have been able to dissect the structure and function relationships involved in protein plaque formation in the pathophysiology of Alzheimer disease; study the feasibility of gene therapy approaches for cystic fibrosis, sickle-cell disease, and hemophilia; determine the characteristics of protein receptors at neurotransmitter binding sites and design analogs with novel pharmaceutical properties; examine the viral proteins involved in immunodeficiency disease; and improve the properties of industrial enzymes used in food science and technology.

=== Administrator ===
Smith was an administrator in 1981 at the Faculty of Medicine elected representative to the UBC Senate. He served on the advisory committee of the Canadian Institute for Advanced Research Evolutionary Biology Program and on the Biotechnology Sector Committee of British Columbia. 1982 Smith launched the Centre for Molecular Genetics in the Faculty of Medicine and became its director in 1986. He was the interim scientific director of the UBC Biomedical Research Centre in 1991.

==== Biotechnology Laboratory and PENCE ====
In 1987, the Biotechnology Laboratory, one of three provincial "Centres of Excellence" was established at UBC. The new facility subsumed the Centre for Molecular Genetics, and Smith became its director. He played an important role in drawing together scientists, and in writing the proposal for what would become the "Protein Engineering Network of Centres of Excellence" or PENCE.

==== Genome Sequence Centre ====
Throughout the 1980s, Smith and his colleagues at the Canadian Institute for Advanced Research advocated for the establishment of a facility that would enable Canada to play a part in what had become known as the Human Genome Project. Eventually, funding was secured from the BC Cancer Agency and in 1999 the Genome Sequence Centre was established with a mandate to develop and deploy genomics technologies in support of the life sciences, and in particular cancer research. The Genome Sciences Centre also provided technology to Genome Canada and Genome BC projects in the areas of human health, the environment, forestry, agriculture, and aquaculture.

=== Commercial ventures ===
In 1981 Smith ventured into the business world as a pharmaceutical entrepreneur. In collaboration with Professors Earl W. Davie and Benjamin D. Hall of the University of Washington founded ZymoGenetics in Seattle, Washington, US. The company began working on recombinant proteins in an international initiative with Novo of Denmark. Recombinant DNA is used mostly in basic research. ZymoGenetics was acquired by Bristol-Myers Squibb. Further applications of recombinant DNA are found in human and veterinary medicine, in agriculture, and in bioengineering.

== Awards and honours ==
Smith received many awards in addition to the Nobel Prize, and was known for his generosity. He donated half of the Nobel Prize money to researchers working on the genetics of schizophrenia. The other half he gave to BC Science World and to the Society for Canadian Women in Science and Technology. He received the Royal Bank Award in 1999, and donated the companion grant to the BC Cancer Foundation.

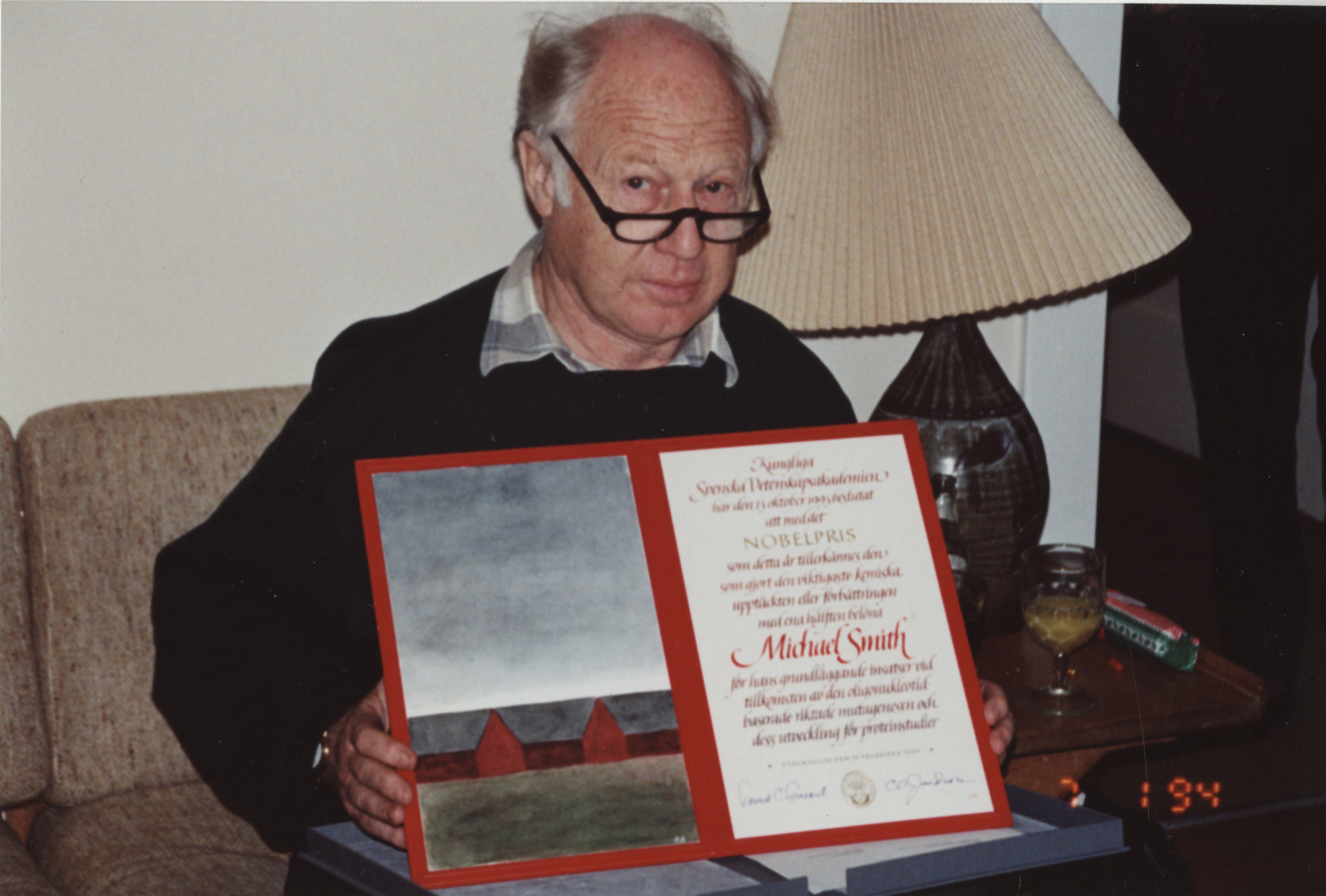
Michael Smith, Nobel prize winner, party at Mary Vickers's house, 1994.

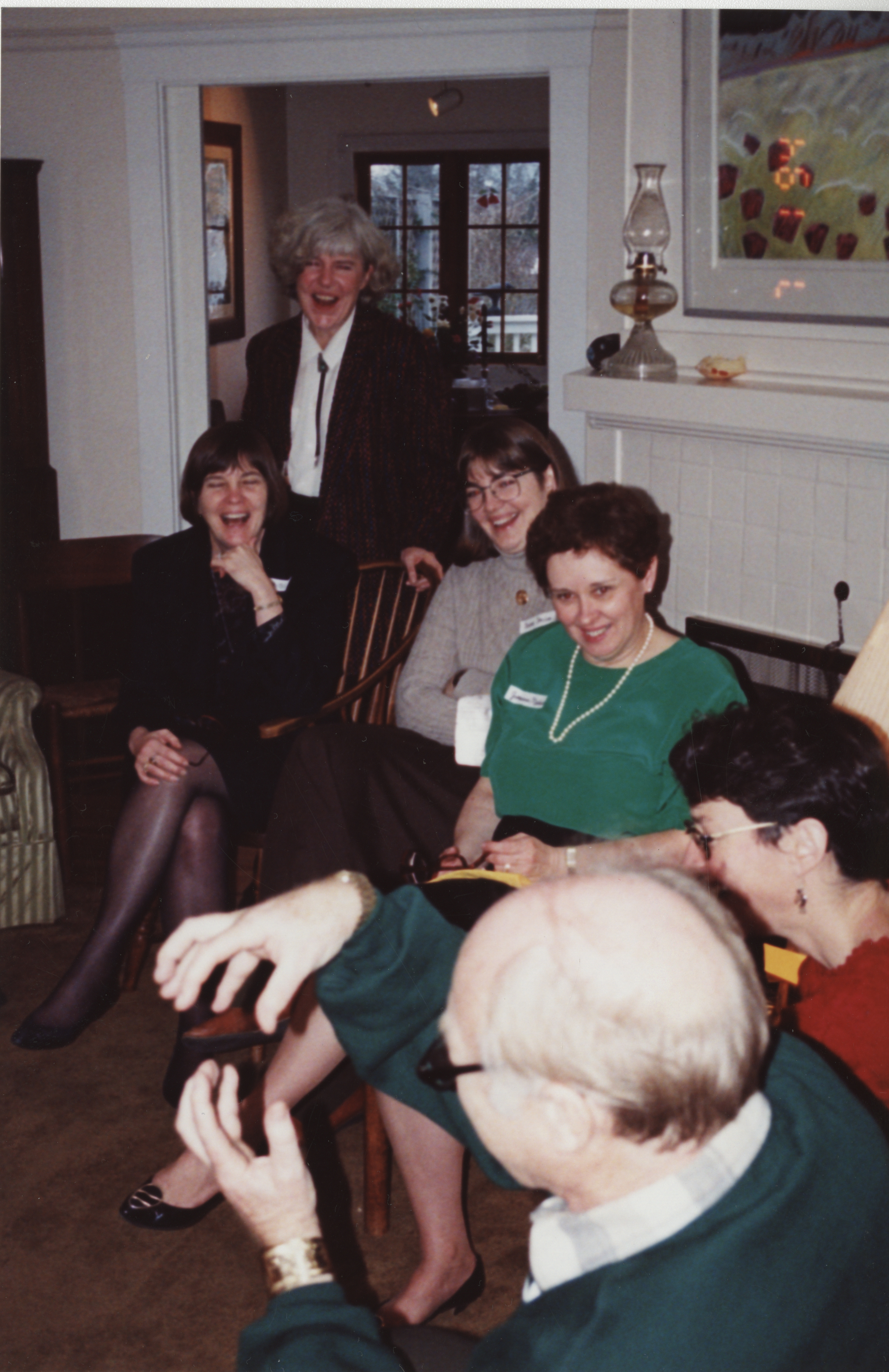
Michael Smith, Nobel prize winner, party at Mary Vickers's house, 1994.

- 1977 UBC Jacob Biely Faculty Research Prize
- 1981 Canadian Biochemical Society Boehringer Mannheim Prize
- 1981 Fellow of the Royal Society of Canada
- 1984 Science Council of British Columbia Gold Medal
- 1986 Elected a Fellow of the Royal Society (FRS) of London
- 1986 Gairdner Foundation International Award for Chemistry
- 1986 UBC Killam Research Prize
- 1988 Genetics Society of Canada Award of Excellence
- 1989 Canadian Federation of Biological Societies G. Malcolm Brown Award
- 1992 Flavelle Medal, Royal Society of Canada
- 1993 Nobel Prize for Chemistry (shared with Kary B. Mullis)
- 1994 Principal Award, the Manning Innovation Awards Foundation Prize
- 1994 Order of British Columbia
- 1994 UBC Peter Wall Distinguished Professor of Biotechnology
- 1994 Golden Plate Award of the American Academy of Achievement
- 1995 Companion of the Order of Canada
- 1999 BC Biotechnology Award for Innovation and Achievement
- 2004 Biography No Ordinary Mike published.

Recognition of his achievements also included several honorary degrees. The following are named in Smith's honour:

- 2001 Michael Smith Foundation for Health Research founded
- 2004 UBC Biotechnology Laboratories was renamed the Michael Smith Laboratories
- 2004 Canada's Michael Smith Genome Sciences Centre named in his honour
- 2004 University of Manchester named its new biological sciences research centre the Michael Smith Building
- 2005 Opening of the Smith-Yuen Apartments in Vancouver

His certificate of election to the Royal Society reads:

He has made many contributions to the chemistry and molecular biology of nucleotides and polynucleotides. With nucleotides these include developing general procedures for synthesis of nucleoside 5'-mono- and polyphosphates, and 3'-5' cyclic phosphates. With polynucleotides he has developed new methods for chemical and enzymatic synthesis of oligodeoxyribonucleotides; devised more convenient strategies for sequence determination and determined the sequences of phage and yeast genes; pioneered application of synthetic oligodeoxyribonucleotides to problems in molecular biology including their use as probes in gene isolation, as primers in sequencing double-stranded DNA and mRNA, and most importantly, as specific mutagens in site-directed mutagenesis.
