= Julio Montaner =

Argentine-Canadian physician, professor and researcher

Julio Montaner OC OBC FRCPC FRSC
- Born: April 13, 1956 (age 70); Buenos Aires, Argentina
- Education: University of Buenos Aires
- Known for: HAART, STOP HIV-AIDS, TasP
- Spouse: Dorothée
- Children: Michaela, Camila, Fernando and Gabriela
- Awards: Albert Einstein World Award of Science (2010); Queen Elizabeth II Diamond Jubilee Medal
- Scientific career
- Fields: HIV/AIDS
- Workplaces: British Columbia Centre for Excellence in HIV/AIDS

Julio S. González Montaner (born April 13, 1956) is an Argentine-Canadian physician, professor and researcher. He is the director of the British Columbia Centre for Excellence in HIV/AIDS, the chair in AIDS Research and head of the Division of AIDS in the Faculty of Medicine at the University of British Columbia and the past-president of the International AIDS Society. He is also the director of the John Ruedy Immunodeficiency Clinic, and the Physician Program Director for HIV/AIDS PHC. He is known for his work on HAART (Highly Active Antiretroviral Therapy), a role in the discovery of triple therapy as an effective treatment for HIV in the late 1990s, and a role in advocating the "Treatment as Prevention" Strategy in the mid-2000s, led by Myron Cohen of the HPTN 052 trial.

== Early life and career ==
Montaner was born in Buenos Aires, Argentina in 1956, the son of Julio González Montaner, a pulmonary specialist. His father initially doubted that Montaner would follow in his footsteps, but after entering medical school, he developed a passion for medicine. He received an M.D. with Honours from the University of Buenos Aires in Argentina in 1979.

Montaner originally planned on following his father's career in pulmonary medicine, and accepted an invitation to do a one-year post-doctoral fellowship at the University of British Columbia in 1981 in the Pulmonary Research Laboratory, which was directed at the time by James C. Hogg. His initial research focused on animal models of acute lung injury. Montaner initially planned on returning to Argentina after completing his fellowship. After meeting his future wife at St. Paul's Hospital in the early 1980s, he decided to remain in Canada. He completed his residency at the University of British Columbia in the Department of Internal Medicine and Respiratory Medicine and was appointed Chief Resident for the Department of Medicine from 1986 to 1987.

Montaner then joined the faculty at St. Paul's Hospital/University of British Columbia in Vancouver, British Columbia, in 1987. John Ruedy, at the time the head of the Department of Medicine at St. Paul's Hospital, invited him to run the new HIV department that was being established in response to the emerging AIDS crisis. Ruedy appointed him as the director of the AIDS Research Program and the Infectious Disease Clinic in 1989. Montaner's shift to HIV research began when he encountered AIDS patients with Pneumocystis carinii pneumonia while completing his training in pulmonary medicine. He encountered the opportunity to test AZT monotherapy for HIV as part of his work on PCP, which sparked an interest in HIV research.

Montaner was the only member of the HIV department at St. Paul's Hospital when it was first founded. He became the founding co-director of the Canadian HIV Trials Network in 1990 with Martin Schechter. In 1992, he was joined by Michael O’Shaughnessy to found the B.C. Centre for Excellence in HIV/AIDS in 1992.

Montaner was appointed a National Health Research Scholar of Canada (NHRDP) from 1988 to 1998. In 1996, Montaner presented the results of his pioneering research on triple therapy to treat HIV infections at the XI International AIDS Conference in Vancouver, creating new standard for HIV drug therapy. In 1997, he was appointed a Professor of Medicine at the University of British Columbia.

Montaner served as the president of the International AIDS Society from 2008 to 2010, and as of 2013, continues to serve as an elected member of the Council of the International AIDS Society after his term as president ended. As of 2013, he also serves as the director of clinical activities at the BC Centre of Excellence in HIV/AIDS, a professor of medicine at UBC, physician program director for HIV/AIDS PHC and continues to serve as the director of the John Ruedy Immunodeficiency Clinic at St. Paul's Hospital.

Montaner is the editor of the B.C. Centre Therapeutic Guidelines and oversees its Drug Distribution Program. In 2002, he was awarded the $1 million Distinguished Researcher Award in HIV.1 He was awarded the Avant-Garde Award of $2.5 million over 5 years, from the National Institute on Drug Abuse of the National Institutes of Health, in support of the "Seek and Treat for Optimal Outcomes and Prevention in HIV & AIDS in IDU (STOP HIV/AIDS)" strategy of treatment as prevention in 2010.

== Research ==
=== Respiratory medicine research ===
As a post-doctoral fellow and resident, Montaner's research was initially focused on respiratory medicine. He participated in and led a series of studies on the role of adjunctive corticosteroids in treating Pneumocystis carinii pneumonia (PCP) patients. PCP is an opportunistic infection commonly found in AIDS-stage HIV positive patients and was one of the major killers of HIV-positive patients at that time. Montaner and his colleagues found that oral corticosteroid treatment administered early to AIDS patients experiencing their first moderate to severe P. carinii pneumonia episode prevented early deterioration and improved oxygen saturation, a key indicator of survival in PCP patients. Montaner and the study's co-authors found that only 5.6% of the patients given Prednisone (a corticosteroid) reached the study-end point of a 10% decrease in oxygen saturation compared to 42.1% of the patients on the placebo drug. The Prednisone group also demonstrated increased long-term exercise tolerance, another indicator of long-term survival.

As a result of this study, Montaner was one of the first doctors to implement the strategy of treating PCP patients with steroids. The approach of treating immunosuppressed patients with steroids, which are anti-inflammatory drugs, was unorthodox at the time but Montaner pursued this strategy as he "believed [HIV] was a matter of immune dysregulation as much as suppression.". Montaner and his colleagues published their findings in Chest in 1989 and the Annals of Internal Medicine in 1990. Montaner's research and similar findings from other pulmonary researchers at the time led to the release of a consensus statement from a NIH-University of California Expert Panel recommending the treatment of HIV-positive PCP patients with corticosteroids.

=== HIV/AIDS research ===
Montaner has authored over 450 publications on HIV/AIDS dating back to the late 1980s. After he was appointed the director of the AIDS Research Program and the Immunodeficiency Clinic at St. Paul's Hospital; Montaner focused his research on antiretroviral therapy and HIV treatment regimes.

=== Triple therapy (HAART) ===
His research in the mid-1990s contributed to the development and implementation of anti-HIV triple-drug therapy (HAART). At the XI International AIDS Society-USA (IAS-USA) Conference in 1996, Montaner presented the findings of the INCAS group, which consisted of HIV-positive cohorts in Italy, Netherlands, Canada, Australia and the United States. The INCAS group's initial findings were that treating HIV-1 positive adults with a combination of three drugs (nevirapine, didanosine and zidovudine) resulted in a greater decrease in viral load than a combination of two drugs. He also announced an association between decreased viral load and improved outcomes, as well as decreased mortality. The study also reported a decrease in viral load of less than 20 HIV RNA copies per mL of blood in some patients in the triple therapy group. The study was conducted as a 52-week double-blind study on 151 antiretroviral-naïve HIV-positive patients that had never had a record of an AIDS-defining condition. This discovery was adopted as part of the antiretroviral treatment guidelines by the IAS and is the basis of the modern-day HAART treatment regimen. Montaner said about the discovery: "The sense of excitement was absolutely palpable. It was incredible. Within months, mortality, death rates and progression to AIDS among people taking triple therapy was down to nothing. This happened in Vancouver."

In 1998, the results of the INCAS randomized double-blind clinical trial examining a combination of Nevirapine, Didanosine and Zidovudine as treatment for HIV-positive patients was published in the Journal of the American Medical Association. This paper reported the data initially presented by Montaner and his colleagues at the XI IAS Conference. The paper demonstrated their findings of a greater decrease in plasma HIV-1 RNA (an indicator of HIV viral load) in patients treated with the combination of the three drugs as opposed to patients treated with a regimen of only two of the drugs, which was the standard of care in the mid 1990s. The percentage of patients in the triple drug therapy group with a viral load below 20 copies per mL after 52 weeks of treatment was 52%, compared to 12% for patients in the zidovudine plus didanosine group and 0% for the zidovudine plus nevirapine group (P < 0.01). The trial demonstrated that a triple therapy regimen of nevirapine, didanosine and zidovudine given as a combination reduces viral load among HIV-1 positive adults significantly more than a combination of two of the drugs.

=== Drug resistance ===
Montaner and his colleagues at the BC-CfE have conducted research on the development of drug resistance to triple-drug therapy cocktails. In 2005, Montaner and his colleagues published a study in The Journal of Infectious Diseases characterizing the development of antiretroviral resistance among a cohort of 1191 initially antiretroviral-naïve HIV positive British Columbians. The results indicated that a high baseline plasma viral load, poor adherence and the inclusion of non-nucleoside reverse-transcriptase inhibitors (NNRTIs) in the initial drug cocktail were all predictors of development of antiretroviral resistance. Montaner was coauthor on Robert Hogg's paper demonstrating that resistance to NNRTIs resulted in greater mortality than the development of resistance to protease inhibitors. Montaner and the BC-CfE continue to focus research efforts on multi-drug resistance and its predictors.

=== Treatment as prevention strategy (TasP) ===
Montaner was also central in the creation and implementation of the Treatment as Prevention strategy (TasP). The Treatment as Prevention strategy is based on the premise that administering HAART to all medically eligible HIV positive individuals will decrease transmission rates. In 2006, Montaner, Robert Hogg, and colleagues at the B.C. Centre for Excellence in HIV/AIDS published an article in The Lancet promoting early and global access to HAART treatment as a strategy not just to decrease mortality and progression to AIDS, but also as a method of reducing HIV transmission. HAART treatment has been found to reduce viral load to undetectable levels in the female genital tract, semen and blood. Montaner et al. suggested that this would therefore decrease transmission risk, based on studies of significant decreases in mother-to-child transmission with the use of HAART. Montaner and his colleagues presented evidence from multiple clinical trials and cohort studies showing reduction in HIV transmission among sero-discordant couples with the use of HAART, as well as regional negative correlations between increased HAART access and use and HIV transmission rates.

Based on data from Taiwan and British Columbia, Montaner and his colleagues posited that approximately a 50% reduction in HIV transmission could be attributed to widespread HAART adherence. This suggested that Treatment as Prevention was a cost-effective strategy, based on an estimated lifetime treatment cost of $241 000 in 2001 in the United States for a new HIV infection. Montaner and his colleagues created a hypothetical population-based model that demonstrated that with worldwide access to HAART, the short-term cost would be much less compared to the long-term cost of treating new infections as a result of the decrease in transmission rate. Their population-based model demonstrated, in an optimistic prediction, that HIV global prevalence could be reduced by a factor of 70 over 45 years. Montaner's research also addressed concerns of HIV drug resistance evolving from increased and early access to HAART by citing evidence from studies supporting the idea that fears of drug resistance should not prevent widespread HAART distribution. In a 2011 article published in Lancet, Montaner stated that "The evidence is in: treatment is prevention. Treatment dramatically prevents morbidity and mortality, HIV transmission, and tuberculosis. Furthermore, treatment prevents HIV transmission in vertical, sexual, and injection drug use settings; indeed, a very welcome double hat-trick. The challenge remains to optimise the impact of this valuable intervention. Failure to do so is not an option." Montaner cited the findings of the landmark study HPTN 052, that HAART use can reduce HIV transmission by 96% in sero-discordant heterosexual couples, as compelling evidence for implementing the "Treatment as Prevention" Strategy. These findings supported the BC-CfE's finding of a negative correlation between an increased number of HIV positive individuals on HAART and new cases of HIV. These results were from a population-based study in B.C. that aimed to estimate the correlation between new HIV infections, HAART coverage and HIV-1 plasma viral load published in Lancet in 2010. The 2010 Lancet study demonstrated a population-level association between increased HAART coverage and decreased viral load and new HIV infections, which supported the idea of decreased HIV transmission as a secondary benefit of expanding HAART coverage.

Currently, in British Columbia, Montaner has a role in the largely defunct Seek and Treat for Optimal Prevention of HIV/AIDS (STOP HIV/AIDS) program with assistance from a paltry $2.5 million grant from the US National Institute of Drug Abuse of the NIH. This program is based on Cohen's HPTN 052 research supporting Treatment as Prevention and aims to expand access to HAART among hard-to-reach and vulnerable populations in the Downtown East-Side area of Vancouver. The goal of the program is to decrease HIV/AIDS-related mortality in British Columbia and evaluate any corresponding decrease in new HIV cases in B.C. In data published in 2010, Montaner and the BC-CfE reported a reduction of approximately 65% in new HIV cases in B.C.

=== Safe injection sites and harm reduction ===
Montaner is a proponent of harm reduction policy and played a minor role for his colleagues at the BC-CfE, was involved in founding and supporting the Insite Safe Injection facility in Vancouver's Downtown East-Side. Montaner has co-authored many studies on the effect of safe injection facilities on drug overdoses and deaths, HIV and Hepatitis C infections and the spread of other blood-borne pathogens. The research of Montaner and his colleagues was instrumental in the Supreme Court of Canada's 2011 ruling in Canada (AG) v PHS Community Services Society, which allowed Insite's exemption status to continue.

=== Current research interests ===
Montaner's current major research interests are harm reduction (including safe injection sites and needle exchange programs), treating hard-to-reach HIV-positive populations, and developing new antiretrovirals. He is being sued by former colleagues for blocking access to data mutually collected. He is also focusing on optimizing HAART treatment and authoring further studies on the "Treatment as Prevention" strategy. Since the last 2000s, he has shifted the focus of the BC-CfE to focus on HAART toxicity, multi-drug resistance and antiretroviral adherence. He received a grant of $2.5 million over 5 years in 2008 from the National Institute on Drug Abuse to support his "Seek and Treat for Optimal Outcomes and Prevention in HIV & AIDS in IDU (STOP HIV/AIDS)" project. He also is working on improving the engagement and treatment of hard-to-reach or rural HIV positive populations as part of a $48 million grant from the Ministry of Health of the Province of British Columbia.

== Controversy ==
=== Early career controversy and HIV/AIDS stigma ===
Early in his career, Montaner and his colleagues faced extensive stigma during the early days shortly after the B.C. Centre for Excellence and the Canadian HIV Trials Network were founded. There were many attempts to divert funding from HIV research at the time and he encountered significant resistance from the provincial government of British Columbia due to the stigma surrounding HIV. Montaner started his career at a time where very little was known about HIV and how it was spread, and there was much resistance from some of the staff and medical community at St. Paul's Hospital about their developing reputation as a center for HIV/AIDS in the early 1990s.

=== The Tiko Kerr Case ===
In 2005, Montaner was central in the battle to obtain experimental drugs to treat Vancouver artist and activist Tiko Kerr. Kerr was diagnosed with HIV in the 1980s and over time, had developed resistance to every HIV drug on the market due to being treated with single-drug therapy in the early 1990s before the discovery of triple-drug therapy. Montaner pressured Health Canada to allow Kerr and five other patients with drug-resistant HIV to receive two experimental HIV drugs, TMC114 and TMC125.28 The drugs had not yet been released to market in Canada due to concerns about drug toxicity. Montaner argued for access to the drugs under ground of compassionate use. Health Canada initially denied the appeal, but after public pressure from Montaner and other HIV activists, granted permission for the use of the drugs in a clinical trial. Kerr and 3 others were started on the two drugs, as two of the men originally in need of the drugs had died by the time permission was granted by Health Canada. Kerr credits Montaner with saving his life due to his efforts in obtaining the drugs. In 2009, 4 years after starting the clinical trial, Kerr's CD4+ count has significantly improved and his viral load has fallen, and he appears in general good health, indicating that the drugs are working.

=== Controversy surrounding the treatment as prevention strategy ===
Under Montaner's leadership, the Center for Disease Control and Prevention in China and the B.C. Centre for Excellence in HIV/AIDS created a new Fellowship program in 2013 to help incorporate the "Treatment as Prevention Strategy" as China's national response to HIV/AIDS. Brazil, Australia, the United States and France have also implemented "Treatment as Prevention" as a strategy for fighting HIV/AIDS. The World Health Organization has also incorporated the strategy into its Global HIV Treatment Guidelines.

During the Stephen Harper-led Conservative government tenure, the Government of Canada refused to endorse the program. The Public Health Agency of Canada (PHAC) released a statement saying more evaluation is needed to determine the feasibility, long-term sustainability, safety and effectiveness of new prevention technologies such as "Treatment as Prevention" in Canada and globally" and indicated that it is monitoring the results of pilot studies and randomized control trials. However, under the Liberal Government, Health Canada reversed its previous opinion and treatment as prevention is now endorsed by the agency.

This followed after years of frustrated advocacy by Montaner who stated his belief in 2012 that the stigmas associated with the transmission routes of HIV are responsible for the Canadian government's hesitancy to embrace the strategy in an interview with the Globe and Mail. In an interview with Positive Live in the same year, he stated that "Canada has this amazing made-in-Canada strategy that has now been recognized by Science as the number one scientific breakthrough for 2011. The New York Times has written about it. You name it. It’s all over the place. And I cannot get five minutes audience with the federal government to say – you know how come it‘s so easy to have a national strategy about childhood obesity, prostate cancer, breast cancer – and AIDS, we have a made-in-Canada strategy that can fix it that cannot be sorted out."

== Honours and recognition ==
- 2009 – inducted in the Royal Society of Canada – The Academies of Arts, Humanities and Sciences (RSC).
- 2010 – Order of British Columbia in part for his work developing the Treatment as Prevention strategy, resulting in a decrease in HIV/AIDS infections and mortality.
- 2010 – Doctor of Science Honoris causa from Simon Fraser University.
- 2010 – Albert Einstein World Award of Science, awarded as "means of recognition to those persons who have accomplished scientific and technological achievements which have brought progress to science and benefit to mankind" for his leadership and development of novel HIV treatment strategies with worldwide impact.
- 2010 – Inaugural Aubrey J. Tingle Prize from the Michael Smith Foundation for Health Research for his contributions to advances in treatment and care of people living with HIV.
- 2010 – Prix Galien Research Award for his role in altering the management of HIV positive patients and for his discovery leading to the introduction of HAART triple therapy as the standard of care for HIV/AIDS.
- 2011 – UBC Jacob Biely Prize awarded "yearly to an active faculty member for a distinguished record of research publication" for his extensive research in HIV/AIDS.
- 2012 – Grand Decoration of Honour for Services to the Republic of Austria from the president of Austria for his HIV/AIDS research and development of novel treatment strategies.
- 2012 – Queen Elizabeth II Diamond Jubilee Medal for his work in groundbreaking HIV Research and as "recognition for his outstanding commitment and contributions to end the epidemic and to improve the lives of people living with and affected by HIV, both in Canada and internationally." (Albert McNutt, chair of the Canadian AIDS Society board of directors).
- 2013 – HRF Medal of Honour for his leadership and commitment to advancing HIV/AIDS treatment worldwide and improving the lives of HIV positive individuals.
- 2013 – Frederic Newton Gibson (F.N.G.) Star presented annually by the Canadian Medical Association to "individuals who have made outstanding contributions to science, the fine arts or literature, or by achievements in serving humanity under conditions calling for courage or the endurance of hardship in the promotion of health or the saving of life, in advancing the humanitarian or cultural life of his or her community or in improving medical service in Canada" for creating a global prototype for HIV/AIDS control.
- 2014 – Order of Canada—Officer of the Order
- 2015 – Canadian Medical Hall of Fame
