= Aubrey Tingle =

Canadian pediatrician

- Education: University of Alberta, McGill University
- Known for: immunology
- Awards: Order of British Columbia
- Scientific career
- Workplaces: University of British Columbia, Michael Smith Foundation for Health Research, British Columbia's Children's Hospital

Aubrey Tingle OBC is professor emeritus in the Department of Pediatrics at the University of British Columbia (UBC) and chair of the board of directors at the Maternal, Infant, Child and Youth Research Network. In March 2001, Tingle was appointed the first president and CEO of The Michael Smith Foundation for Health Research (MSFHR).

Prior to his position at MSFHR, Tingle was assistant dean of research in the Faculty of Medicine at UBC, and vice president of research and education at the Children's & Women's Health Centre of British Columbia. He also played a leadership role in building the Research Institute for Children's & Women's Health at the Children's & Women's Health Centre of British Columbia, and was its inaugural executive director. In addition, he was a founding member of the National Alliance of Provincial Health Research Organizations (NAPHRO) and was co-chair from 2004 to 2006.

== Education ==
Tingle received his pre-med training in zoology from the University of Alberta, Edmonton, in 1963 and his MD from the same university in 1967, when he received the Gold Medal in paediatrics. He received his PhD in immunology from McGill University, Montreal in 1973.

== Career ==
His areas of special professional interest are immunology of viral infection, auto-immune disease, immune deficiency disorders, research administration and strategic planning. The focus of his research has been the relationship between persistent viral infection and the development of disease. His enquiries have used, as a model, a connection between rubella, rubella immunization, and auto-immune arthritis.

He was Executive Director (1993 – 2001) of the BC Research Institute for Children's & Women's Health (formerly known as the BC Research Institute for Child & Family Health)

In May 2001, he was appointed as the first president and CEO of the newly established Michael Smith Foundation for Health Research (MSFHR).

=== Awards ===
The Paediatric Chairs of Canada (PCC) awarded him the inaugural Paediatric Academic Leadership Clinical Researcher Award. for " excellence in leadership and innovation in fostering multiple environments that have advanced child and youth health research in Vancouver, the Province of British Columbia, and across Canada." The Canadian Federation of Biological Societies (CFBS) Political Advocacy of Science Award was presented to Dr. Tingle in 2004.for " leadership in the development, launching and stewardship of the Michael Smith Foundation for Health Research. H"'

In 2007, Tingle received the British Columbia Biotechnology Award in the category of Leadership. LifeSciences BC credits Tingle, the president and CEO of the provincially mandated Michael Smith Foundation for Health Research (from 2001 to 2008), for having "an unprecedented impact" on strengthening publicly funded research, in British Columbia."

=== Aubrey J. Tingle Prize ===
The Aubrey J. Tingle Prize was created to honour the important role Tingle played as founding president and CEO of the Michael Smith Foundation for Health Research from 2001 until his retirement in June 2008. The prize is given to a British Columbia clinician scientist or scholar practitioner whose work in health research is internationally recognized and has significant impact on advancing clinical or health services and policy research — as well as its uptake — to improve health and the health system in BC and globally.

The inaugural prize was awarded to Dr. Julio Montaner in 2010; subsequent recipients have been Dr. Michael Hayden (2011) and Dr. Bruce McManus (2012).

== Current activities ==
- Chair, Board of Directors, Maternal Infant Child and Youth Research Network
- Member, Board of Directors, Alberta Innovates – Health Solutions
- Member, Scientific Advisory Committee, C.H.I.L.D Foundation
- Member, Board of Directors, Canadian Human Immunology Network
