= Krista and Tatiana Hogan =

Canadian craniopagus conjoined twins

Krista Hogan and Tatiana Hogan
- Born: October 25, 2006 (age 19); Vancouver, British Columbia, Canada
- Parent(s): Felicia Simms and Brendan Hogan

Krista Hogan and Tatiana Hogan (born October 25, 2006) are Canadian conjoined craniopagus twins. They are joined at the head and have separate brains that are interconnected by a "thalamic bridge" within a shared skull. They were born in Vancouver, British Columbia, and are the only unseparated conjoined twins of their type currently alive in Canada. They live with their mother, Felicia Simms, in Vernon, British Columbia, have two sisters and a brother, and often travel to Vancouver for care at British Columbia Children's Hospital.

== Birth ==
The twins were given a 20 percent chance of survival at birth. At birth at B.C. Women's Hospital & Health Centre, they were described as "wriggly, vigorous, and very vocal". They weighed 12 and a half pounds (5.7 kg) when they were delivered by Caesarean section.

== Early infant life ==
Tatiana is smaller and less robust than Krista. Tests done in April 2007 showed that Tatiana's heart was working harder than Krista's and that she had high blood pressure because of it—Tatiana's heart was supplying part of her blood to Krista's brain. A surgery was planned to give Krista's heart a "jump start" so Tatiana's would not have to work so hard.

The twins' nervous systems are highly interconnected. Their doctors reported that when one of them is tickled, the other jumps, and that putting a pacifier in the mouth of one could cause the other to stop crying.

The twins' birth and potential separation, the depth of community support, and their family's financial situation have been subject to significant media coverage in Canada. They and their mother were also guests on The Tyra Banks Show in the U.S.

In August 2007, it was declared the twins cannot be separated, due to the likelihood of the surgery killing or paralyzing one or both of them.

The family reduced the twins' public profile due to a contract giving exclusive access to a documentary crew for National Geographic and Discovery Channel. The show was broadcast first in Britain in spring 2010, and then aired in June in Canada and the U.S.

The documentary followed a year in the twins' life and included a "particularly poignant" meeting between the family and Lori and George Schappell, 51, the world’s oldest twins to survive being joined at the head.

There is evidence suggesting that the twins can see through each other's eyes due to brain conjoining. Their thalami are joined by connector tissue, a "thalamic bridge".

== Progression to childhood ==
In January 2009, a documentary was filmed which reported on the twins, and followed their progress up to their third birthday. This documentary was released and aired in October, 2010. In this documentary, it was confirmed that though each girl has her own thalamus, there is a connector piece, a "thalamus bridge", which connects the two thalami together. Through this shared brain tissue structure and the interconnected neurons, one brain receives signals from the other brain and vice versa. This documentary also reported on experiments that were carried out that confirmed that visual cortex signals based on what one girl saw were received by both girls' brains. So in effect, one twin could see what the other twin was seeing, making them unique even among craniopagus twins.

At this time, Tatiana suffered from a sleep apnea condition that occasionally caused her to stop breathing for up to 20 seconds. A sleep apnea specialist, Dr. Fred Kozak, surgically treated her sleep apnea. Not long after the surgery, her heart shrank to a more normal size and its rate dropped such that it no longer carried all of the burden of circulating blood for both brains.

The documentary reports that the twins are progressing well, and have achieved all the normal childhood milestones, such as walking, talking, and counting.

A 2014 CBC Radio documentary described how they can feel and taste what the other is experiencing. Later it was also confirmed that they can see through each other's eyes.

== Thalamic connection between each other's minds ==
The twins' unique thalamic connection may provide insight into the philosophical and neurological foundations of consciousness. It has been argued that there's no empirical test that can conclusively establish that for some sensations, the twins share one token experience rather than two exactly matching token experiences. Yet background considerations about the way the brain has specific locations for conscious contents, combined with the evident overlapping pathways in the twins' brains, arguably implies that the twins share some conscious experiences. If this is true, then the twins may offer a proof of concept for how experiences in general could be shared between brains.

== See also ==
- Ladan and Laleh Bijani
- Polycephaly
