= BC Children's Hospital Foundation =

Charity in Vancouver, British Columbia

Coordinates: 49.244444°N 123.125556°W

Geography
- Location: 938 West 28th Ave,, Vancouver, British Columbia, Canada

Organization
- Care system: Pediatric care
- Type: Birth to 18 years old

Services
- Emergency department: Over 37,000 patients per year
- Beds: 142

History
- Founded: 1982

Links
- Website: www.bcchf.ca
- Lists: Hospitals in Canada
- Other links: BC Women's Hospital & Health Centre Child & Family Research Institute . Sunny Hill Health Centre for Children .

BC Children's Hospital Foundation (BCCHF) is a Canadian non-profit registered charity that raises money to support the British Columbia Children's Hospital. The Foundation works with communities to raise funds for essentials including: life-saving equipment, research into childhood diseases, a wide range of medical staff and community child health education programs. Since 1982, BC Children's Hospital Foundation has partnered with children, families, health professionals, and other British Columbia residents to raise funds to support BC Children's Hospital, Sunny Hill Health Centre for Children, and the BC Children's Hospital Research Institute.
