= Mount Saint Joseph Hospital =

Hospital in Vancouver, British Columbia, Canada

- Providence Health Care
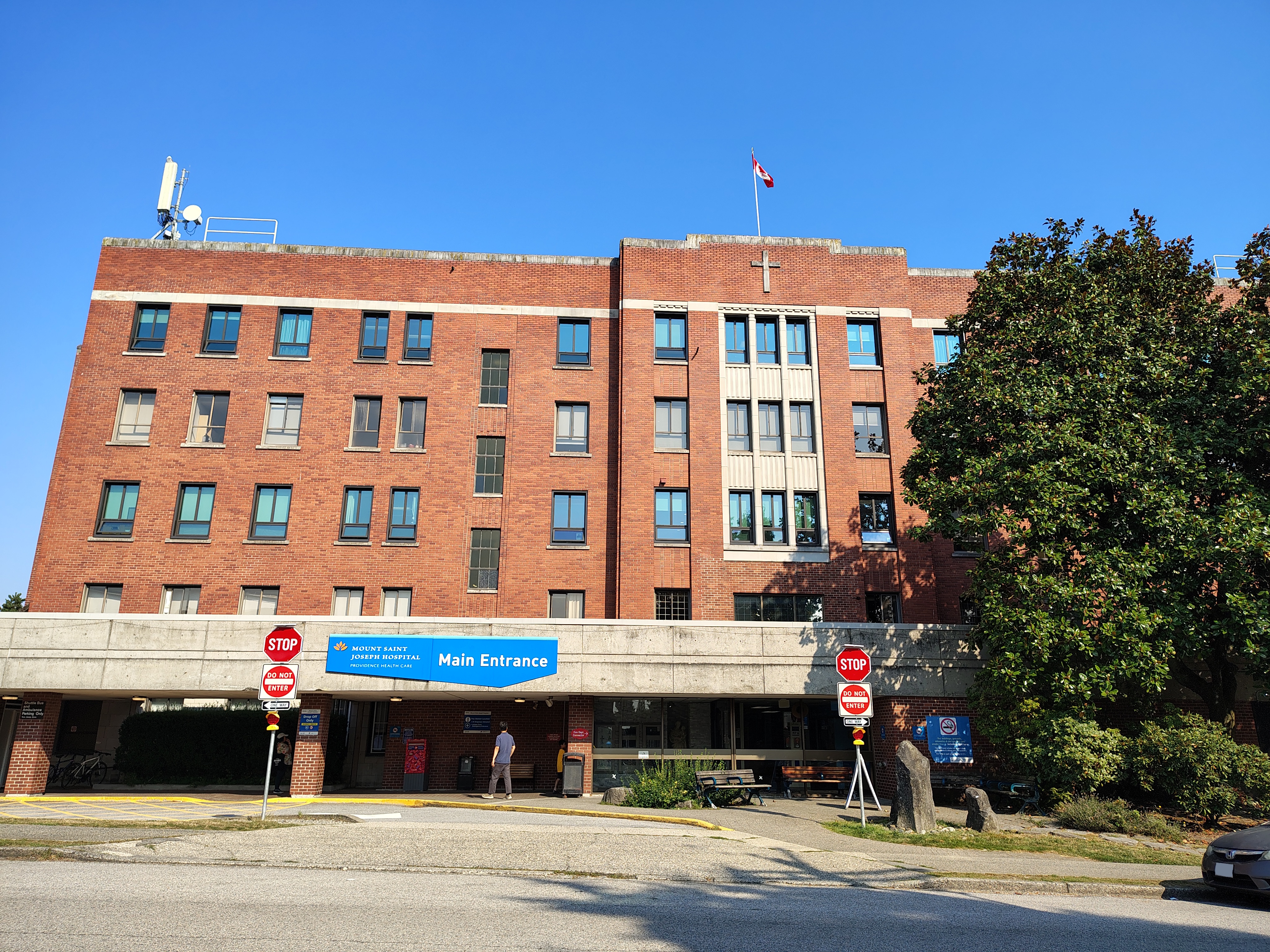
- Main entrance

Geography
- Location: 3080 Prince Edward Street, Vancouver, British Columbia, Canada
- Coordinates: 49.25794°N 123.09557°W

Organization
- Care system: Medicare (Canada)
- Type: Community

Services
- Emergency department: Yes
- Beds: 240

History
- Opened: 1946

Links
- Website: www.providencehealthcare.org/hospitals-residences/mount-saint-joseph-hospital
- Lists: Hospitals in Canada

Mount Saint Joseph Hospital (MSJ) is a community acute-care hospital located in Vancouver, British Columbia. Like St. Paul's Hospital in downtown Vancouver, Mount Saint Joseph is operated by Providence Health Care, a Roman Catholic faith-based care provider.

In addition to acute care facilities, the hospital houses the Mount Saint Joseph Residence, a 100-bed long-term care facility.

== History ==
Founded in 1946, the hospital opened a new 50-bed wing in 1956.

== Facilities ==
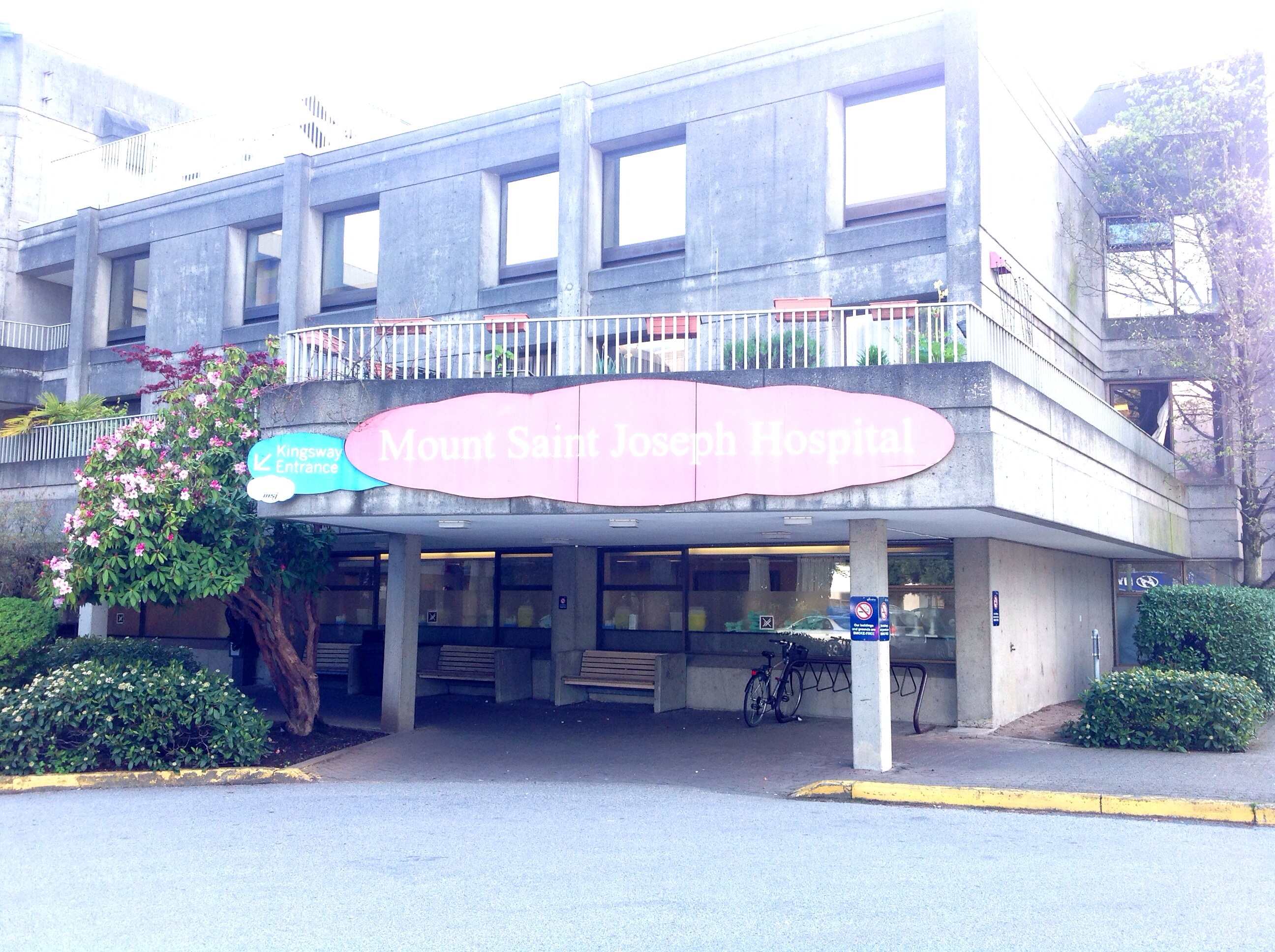
Kingsway entrance

The hospital offers numerous community healthcare services including:

- Emergency care
  - The hospital's emergency department is open daily from 8 am to 8 pm.
- Radiology

== See also ==
- List of hospitals in British Columbia
