= Robert Hogg =

Robert Hogg may refer to:

- Robert L. Hogg (1893–1973), U.S. representative from West Virginia
- Robert S. Hogg, Canadian HIV researcher
- Robert V. Hogg (1924–2014), American statistician and professor at the University of Iowa
- Robert Hogg (biologist) (1818–1897), British scientist
- Robert Hogg (New Zealand politician) (1864–1941), New Zealand politician, journalist, newspaper editor and poet
- Robert Hogg (footballer) (1877–1963), English football player with Sunderland and Blackpool
- Robert Hogg (poet) (1942–2022), Canadian poet, critic, professor, and organic farmer
- Bob Hogg, Australian politician
- Rob Hogg (born 1967), American state senator from the 19th district of Iowa

== See also ==
- Bobby Hogg (disambiguation)
