= James C. Hogg =

Canadian physician (born 1935)

James C. Hogg OC
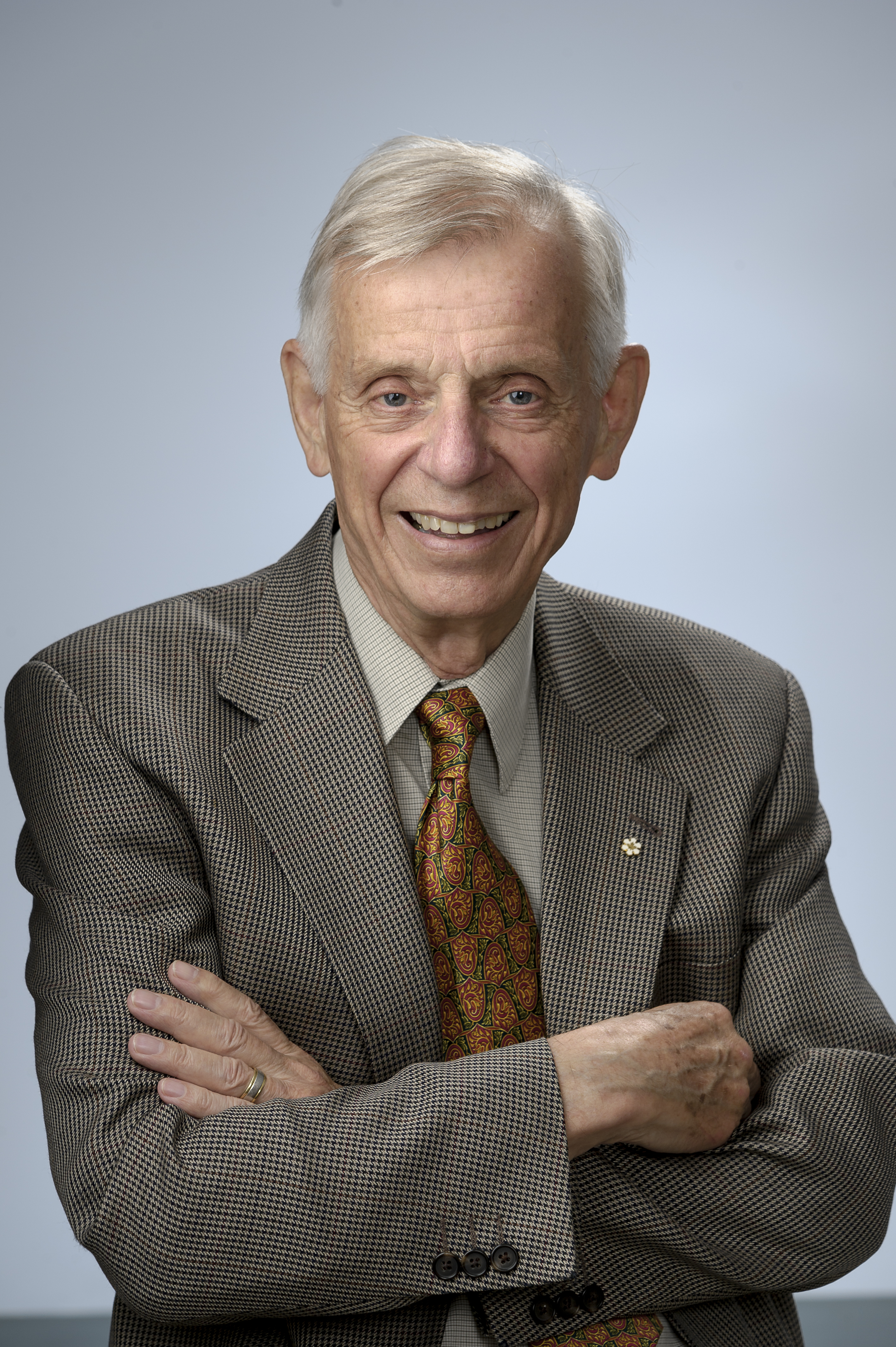
- Born: 1935 (age 90–91); Winnipeg, Canada
- Known for: Lung disease research
- Children: Robert S. Hogg
- Awards: Officer of the Order of Canada, Queen Elizabeth II’s Diamond Jubilee Medal, Canada Gairdner Wightman Award, Royal Society of Canada
- Scientific career
- Fields: Lung disease
- Workplaces: Centre for Heart Lung Innovation
- Website: Google Scholar:

James C. Hogg OC (born December 3, 1935) is a Canadian physician and pulmonary pathologist. Hogg has been recognized for his research into Chronic Obstructive Pulmonary Disease. He received the Canada Gairdner Wightman Award in 2013. He became an officer of the Order of Canada in 2005 and was named to the Canadian Medical Hall of Fame in 2010. He also received the Queen Elizabeth II's Diamond Jubilee Medal.

== Life and career ==
Born in Winnipeg, Manitoba, Hogg studied medicine at the University of Manitoba and McGill University. He completed his residency at the Massachusetts General Hospital and McGill. Hogg became an assistant professor in pathology at McGill in 1971 and moved to the University of British Columbia (UBC) in 1977. He became a fellow of the Royal College of Physicians and Surgeons of Canada in 1974 and of the Royal Society of Canada in 1992. He is the principal investigator at the University of British Columbia Centre for Heart Lung Innovation at St. Paul's Hospital and professor emeritus in the Department of Pathology and Laboratory Medicine at UBC.
