= Bobby Hogg =

Bobby Hogg may refer to:

- Bobby Hogg (footballer, born 1914) (1914–1975), Scottish football player and manager
- Bobby Hogg (footballer, born 1947), soccer player who represented Australia
- Bobby Hogg (Cromarty speaker) (1920–2012), last speaker of the Cromarty dialect

== See also ==
- Robert Hogg (disambiguation)
