= Providence Health Care (Vancouver) =

Hospitals in Vancouver, British Columbia, Canada

- Abbreviation: PHC
- Formation: April 1, 1997; 29 years ago
- Type: Denominational non-profit
- Purpose: health care
- CEO: Fiona Dalton
- Board of directors: Chair: Eric Harris
- Parent organization: Providence Health Care Society
- Affiliations: Vancouver Coastal Health University of British Columbia
- Budget: $833 Million (2012-13)
- Staff: 6,000 staff, 1,000 medical staff/physicians, 200 researchers
- Volunteers: 1,600
- Website: www.providencehealthcare.org

Providence Health Care is a Catholic health care provider that operates seven facilities in Vancouver, British Columbia, Canada.

Providence Health Care was formed through the consolidation of CHARA Health Care Society, Holy Family Hospital and St. Paul's Hospital on April 1, 1997. Providence Health Care became a single legal entity on March 31, 2000. The president of Providence sits on the executive team of Vancouver Coastal Health.

It is a denominational affiliate of Vancouver Coastal Health and partners with the Provincial Health Services Authority and the University of British Columbia to provide services to residents of the Vancouver Coastal region and specialty services to residents across British Columbia. In October 2008, Providence Health Care was named one of BC's Top Employers by Mediacorp Canada Inc., which was announced by The Vancouver Sun, The Province and the Victoria Times-Colonist.

== Facilities and operations ==
- St. Paul's Hospital, an acute care, academic and research hospital with over 500 acute care beds located in downtown Vancouver.
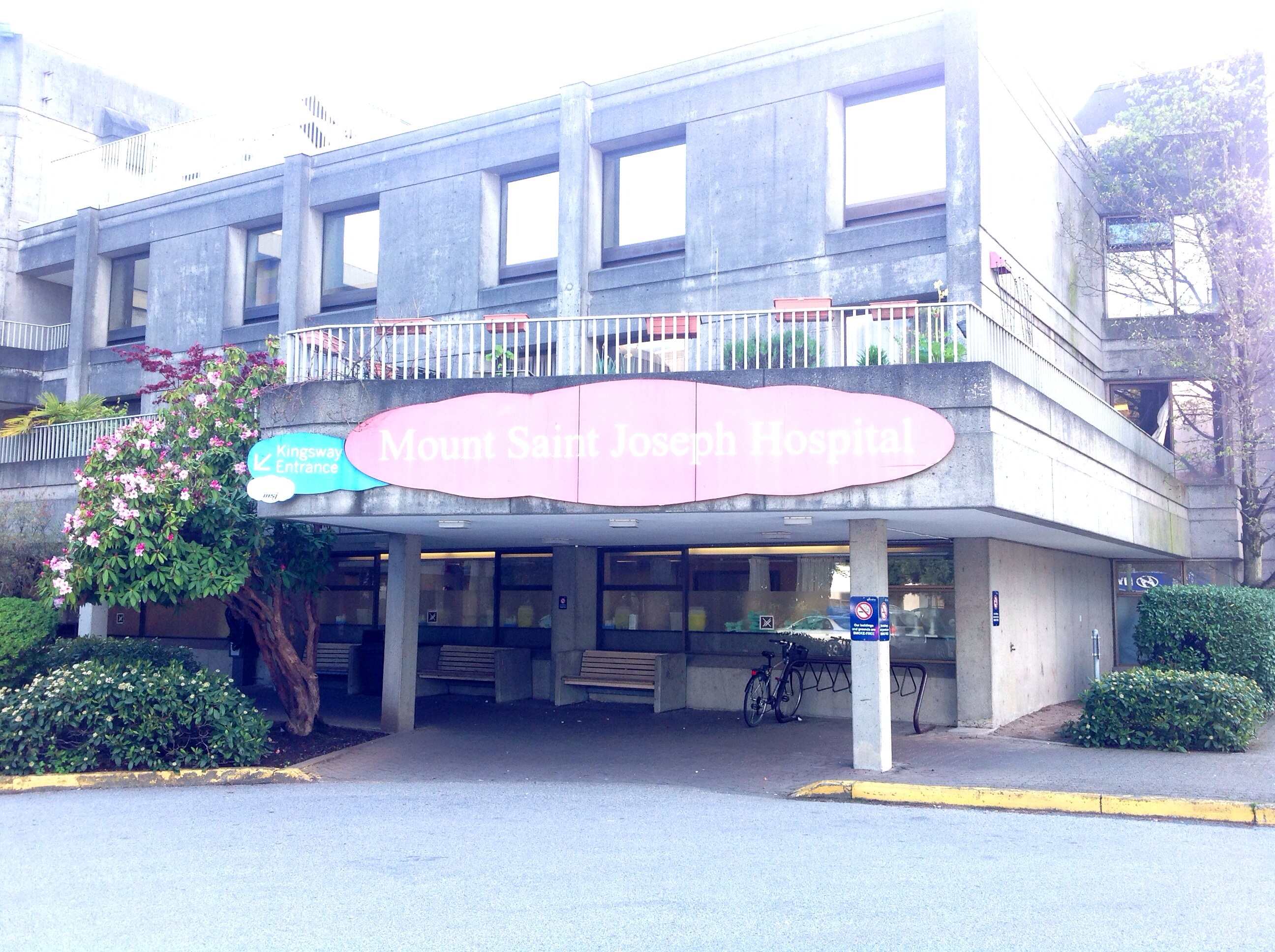
  Entrance to Mount Saint Joseph Hospital
- Mount Saint Joseph Hospital, a community hospital with 140 acute care and 100 extended care beds
- St. Vincent's Hospitals (Brock Fahrni, Langara and Heather pavilions), facilities in Vancouver being redeveloped into a campus of care for seniors
- Holy Family Hospital, a provincial referral centre providing rehabilitation and residential care. Located in South Vancouver, offers 76 inpatient beds, a range of outpatient rehab services and 142 residential care beds.
- Youville Residence, a multi-level care facility that is home to 84 residents
- St John Hospice, 12-bed facility for the care of the terminally ill. It opened in December 2005 as the first hospice on Vancouver's Westside.
