= Provincial Health Services Authority =

Health authority in the Canadian province of British Columbia

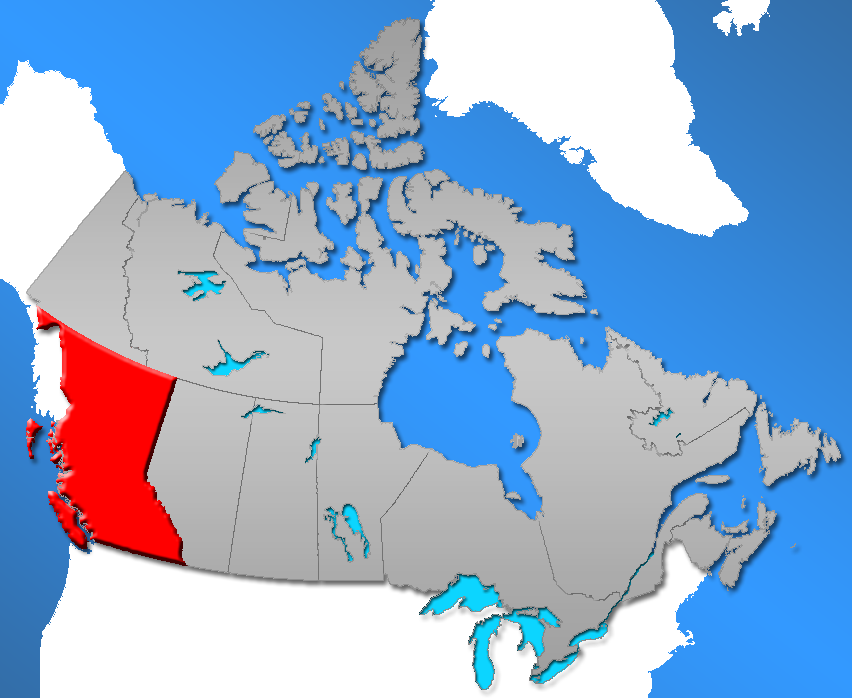
- PHSA serves the entire province
- Formation: December 2001
- Type: British Columbia health authority
- Interim President and CEO: Sean Virani
- Interim Board Chair: Maureen Maloney
- Budget: $6.46 billion (2024–2025)
- Staff: More than 26,000 (2025)
- Website: www.phsa.ca

Provincial Health Services Authority (PHSA) is a publicly funded health authority in the Canadian province of British Columbia. Established in December 2001, it is the only health authority in the province with a province-wide mandate for specialized clinical services, although the First Nations Health Authority also operates non-regionally. The province's other six health authorities (Fraser Health, Interior Health, Island Health, Northern Health, Vancouver Coastal Health, and Providence Health Care) have geographic jurisdictions.

PHSA reports to the British Columbia Ministry of Health and is governed under the BC Health Authorities Act and Societies Act. In its 2024–2025 financial year, the authority reported audited revenue of approximately CA$6.46 billion, audited expenses of approximately CA$6.46 billion, and a workforce described as more than 26,000 employees. PHSA operates a portfolio of provincial clinical agencies, including BC Cancer, the BC Centre for Disease Control, BC Children's Hospital, BC Women's Hospital & Health Centre, BC Emergency Health Services, BC Mental Health and Substance Use Services, BC Renal, BC Transplant, Cardiac Services BC, and Perinatal Services BC, and a number of province-wide programs and registries.

Beginning on 31 March 2025, PHSA underwent a major leadership transition and structural review as part of a province-wide health authority review initiated by the Government of British Columbia. Early findings of the review led to the December 2025 announcement of a new shared-services entity, BC Shared Health Services, and a refocusing of PHSA's mandate on specialized clinical services and academic health science programs.

== History ==
=== Formation ===
PHSA was created in December 2001 as part of the British Columbia government's consolidation of more than 50 health boards into six health authorities, which included five geographic authorities and one province-wide authority. Its founding legal vehicle was the predecessor of the BC Societies Act, and its accountability sits within the framework of the Health Authorities Act and successive Ministry of Health service plans.

=== 2013 senior management compensation controversy ===
The organization's first president and CEO, Lynda Cranston, resigned in June 2013 after the board of directors learned that she had approved wage increases for 118 senior managers without board knowledge during a province-wide public sector wage freeze. The increases were reversed and Cranston received no severance.

=== 2014–2020 Roy tenure ===
Carl Roy served as president and CEO from January 2014 until February 2020.

=== 2020–2021 Morin tenure and PPE procurement review ===
Benoit Morin became president and CEO in February 2020. In late 2020, the BC Ministry of Health initiated a review of PHSA spending after media reports of allegations of misspending raised by whistleblowers. An independent investigation by John Bethel of Ernst & Young released on 9 February 2021 examined PHSA's purchase of personal protective equipment from a Montreal-based vendor and other matters, including disputes about the proposed write-off of part of the purchase and friction between the chief executive, the board, and finance staff. The board parted ways with Morin the same day.

=== 2021–2025 Byres tenure ===
David Byres was appointed president and CEO in February 2021. He held the position until 31 March 2025, when he accepted a secondment to the Minister of Health to work on Indigenous-specific anti-racism initiatives.

=== 2025–2026 health authority review and restructuring ===
On 31 March 2025, the Government of British Columbia announced a review of PHSA, replacing both the chief executive and the board chair and ultimately expanding the review to the regional health authorities. The review led to the December 2025 announcement of a new provincial shared services entity, BC Shared Health Services, and a refocusing of PHSA's mandate.

== Mandate and governance ==
=== Statutory basis and relationship to government ===
PHSA is established under the BC Societies Act and is one of six health authorities accountable to the BC Minister of Health under the Health Authorities Act. Its accountability framework is set out annually in the Ministry of Health service plan and in mandate letters from the Minister of Health. The Ministry of Health describes PHSA as responsible for "provincial clinical policy, delivery of provincial clinical services, provincial commercial services, and provincial digital and information management and information technology" services.

=== Board of directors ===
PHSA's board of directors is appointed by the British Columbia Cabinet. On 31 March 2025, the term of board chair Tim Manning ended, and an interim board was appointed for a one-year term, chaired by Maureen Maloney, OBC, KC, and including Heather McKay and Tiffany Ma, with provision for additional appointments. Maloney signed the 2024–2025 Statement of Executive Compensation as Interim Board Chair. Maloney also signed the 2025–2026 mandate letter response on behalf of the board.

=== Executive leadership ===
Dr. Penny Ballem, formerly chair of Vancouver Coastal Health, was appointed PHSA's interim president and CEO on 31 March 2025 and asked to lead the health authority review of PHSA. She held the role for approximately one year. The PHSA executive page subsequently identified Dr. Sean Virani, a cardiologist and a former president of the Canadian Cardiovascular Society, as interim president and CEO.

== Programs and services ==
PHSA operates and manages a portfolio of provincial clinical agencies, hospitals, and coordination programs.

=== Clinical agencies and hospitals ===
- BC Cancer, which delivers province-wide cancer care through six regional cancer centres and includes the BC Cancer Research Institute and the Michael Smith Genome Sciences Centre.
- BC Centre for Disease Control (BCCDC), which leads provincial communicable disease surveillance and public health emergency response.
- BC Children's Hospital and Sunny Hill Health Centre, the only facilities in BC dedicated to specialized pediatric care.
- BC Women's Hospital & Health Centre, focused on maternity, neonatal, and specialized women's health services.
- BC Emergency Health Services, which operates the BC Ambulance Service and the BC Patient Transfer Network.
- BC Mental Health and Substance Use Services, including the Forensic Psychiatric Hospital, the Red Fish Healing Centre for Mental Health and Addiction, the Heartwood Centre for Women, and Correctional Health Services.

=== Provincial coordination programs and registries ===
PHSA also coordinates a number of province-wide clinical and public health programs, including BC Renal, BC Transplant, Cardiac Services BC, Perinatal Services BC, Trauma Services BC, Stroke Services BC, Critical Care BC, Pain Care BC, Trans Care BC, Child Health BC, the Provincial Infection Control Network of BC, Provincial Laboratory Medicine Services, Provincial Language Services, the Provincial Medical Imaging Office, the Provincial Retinal Disease Treatment program, and the BC Early Hearing Program. The authority hosts the BC Surgical Patient Registry and other provincial registries used in clinical decision-making and reporting.

== Digital health and shared services ==
=== Provincial Digital Health and Information Services ===
PHSA hosts Provincial Digital Health and Information Services (PDHIS), a digital health and information technology service line that, according to PHSA's recruitment site, employs more than 2,000 staff and provides services to PHSA, Vancouver Coastal Health, and Providence Health Care. The 2024–2025 Ministry of Health Annual Service Plan Report states that the BC Digital Health Strategy was launched in partnership with PHSA.

=== Clinical and Systems Transformation ===
PHSA participates in Clinical and Systems Transformation (CST), a regional electronic health record program shared with Vancouver Coastal Health and Providence Health Care; capital costs related to the program are reported in PHSA's audited consolidated financial statements under "Clinical information systems".

=== BC Health Workday ===
PHSA hosts the BC Health Workday Program, a provincial initiative that began in 2023 to implement a Workday-based human capital management system across seven BC health organizations (Fraser Health, Interior Health, Island Health, Northern Health, Providence Health Care, PHSA, and Vancouver Coastal Health) to replace legacy human resources and payroll systems.

=== Provincial Virtual Health ===
Provincial Virtual Health is a PHSA-led program that supports virtual care, virtual visit workflows, and remote patient monitoring across BC's health system, with a focus on rural and remote populations and on integration with Provincial Language Services for interpretation.

=== Artificial intelligence governance ===
PHSA has implemented a province-wide approach to clinical governance for the deployment of artificial intelligence tools, described in a 2024 article in npj Digital Medicine. In late 2025 and early 2026, PHSA led a province-wide trial of six AI medical scribe products under that governance framework, as reported in trade press.

== Emergency management ==
Health Emergency Management BC (HEMBC), a program of PHSA, provides emergency management leadership across the BC health system, including planning, response, and recovery. HEMBC operates the Provincial Disaster Psychosocial Program and the Mobile Medical Unit, and works with the Ministry of Emergency Management and Climate Readiness, BC Wildfire Service, regional health authorities, the First Nations Health Authority, BC Emergency Health Services, and local governments during emergencies including wildfires, floods, atmospheric rivers, and extreme heat.

== Information privacy and cybersecurity ==
PHSA manages the Provincial Public Health Information System (Panorama) on behalf of the BC Ministry of Health. In December 2022, the Office of the Information and Privacy Commissioner for British Columbia released Investigation Report 22-02, Left Untreated: Security gaps in BC's public health database, which identified gaps in security architecture, multi-factor authentication coverage, vulnerability management, and audit logging. A subsequent OIPC follow-up review found that PHSA had made progress on consolidated security architecture documentation and a vulnerability management program.

In December 2025, the Information and Privacy Commissioner reported on an investigation into 71 unauthorized accesses by 36 healthcare workers in three health authorities (including PHSA) of records associated with victims of the 2025 Lapu Lapu Day attack, finding that the authorities had reasonable safeguards but recommending improvements in real-time alert generation and role-based access controls.

== Budget and financial accountability ==
For the year ended 31 March 2025, PHSA's audited consolidated financial statements reported revenue of approximately CA$6,457,680,000 and expenses of approximately CA$6,456,960,000, producing a small annual operating surplus. Ministry of Health contributions accounted for approximately CA$4,675,803,000 of revenue, with recoveries from other health authorities of approximately CA$808 million. The Office of the Auditor General of British Columbia issued a qualified opinion, consistent with a long-standing province-wide accounting departure under Treasury Board Regulation 198/2011 affecting BC public-sector reporting entities. PHSA's financial statements are tabled annually in the BC Public Accounts.

PHSA reports annually on its environmental performance under the Climate Change Accountability Act. Its 2024 Climate Change Accountability Report describes initiatives to reduce greenhouse gas emissions through HVAC upgrades and water-efficient design at facilities such as the planned Quw'utsun Valley Hospital, and disclosed approximately CA$482,000 in carbon offset purchases for the reporting year.

== 2025–2026 health authority review ==
On 31 March 2025, the Government of British Columbia announced a review of PHSA as the first stage of a province-wide review of health authority spending. The stated focus areas were consolidating administrative and corporate functions through a shared-services model, optimizing existing shared services such as procurement and information technology, reducing duplication, and budgeting and accountability. President and CEO David Byres accepted a secondment to the Ministry of Health, and Dr. Penny Ballem was appointed PHSA's interim president and CEO with responsibility for leading the review. The PHSA board was largely replaced by an interim board chaired by Maureen Maloney. Interim measures included a hiring freeze on managerial and non-union positions unrelated to direct patient care.

In June 2025, the review was extended to the five regional health authorities, with Cynthia Johansen, Deputy Minister of Health, leading the regional component. According to the BC government, engagement during the PHSA component included more than 6,200 staff at town halls and large group meetings, more than 1,000 questions and comments at those engagements, and more than 3,900 digital submissions.

In the months following the launch, The Globe and Mail reported that PHSA confirmed 57 staff departures and the elimination of 61 vacancies between May and August 2025, including layoffs at the BC Centre for Disease Control and in finance, business operations, and health system intelligence functions, and the departure of the chief strategy officer. Commentary in Business in Vancouver questioned the absence of a fixed deadline or a written report and raised concerns about the CA$400,000 compensation set for Ballem during the review and her subsequent advisory contract.

In December 2025, the Ministry of Health announced that, based on the early findings of the review, a new standalone provincial entity, BC Shared Health Services, would be established to centralize administrative and corporate functions, including supply chain, finance, and information technology services that PHSA had previously delivered on a province-wide basis. PHSA's mandate was refocused on the delivery of specialized clinical services and academic health science.

== See also ==
- Healthcare in Canada
