= L. J. Blackmore Cancer Research Centre =

Canadian research facility

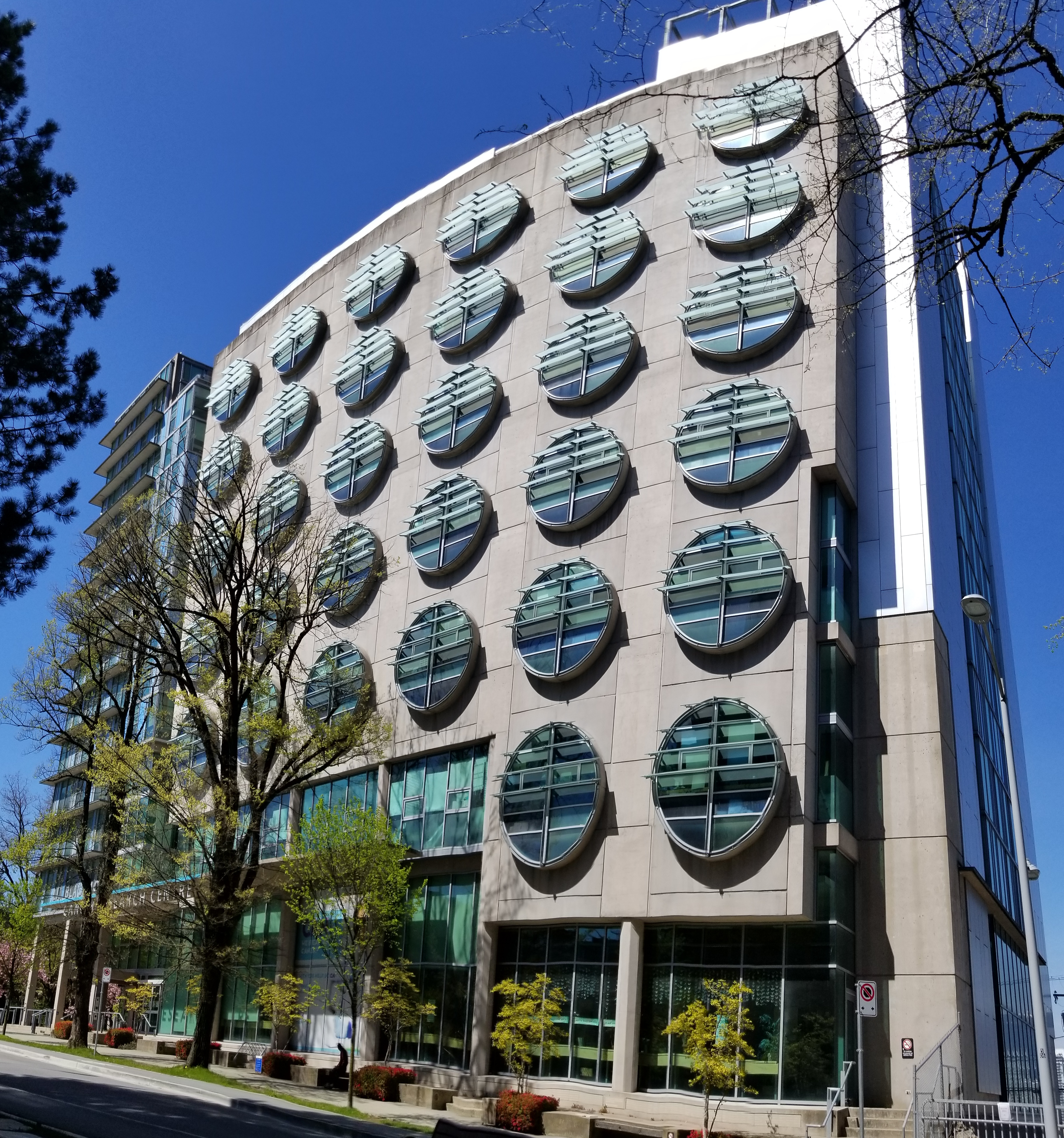
- The L. J. Blackmore Cancer Research Centre was designed by Henriquez Partners Architects.
- Established: September 20, 1979
- Research type: Basic, epidemiological, and clinical
- Field of research: Cancer
- Location: 675 West 10th Avenue, Vancouver, British Columbia, Canada; 49.262442°N 123.119353°W
- Affiliations: University of British Columbia, Simon Fraser University, and the University of Victoria
- Website: BC Cancer Agency Research Centre Website

Map
- Location within Greater Vancouver Regional District

The L. J. Blackmore Cancer Research Centre, formerly the BC Cancer Research Centre (BCCRC) and BCCA Cancer Research Centre, is located in Vancouver, British Columbia, Canada. Scientists and researchers perform basic, epidemiological, and clinical research on cancer prevention, early diagnosis of cancer, the molecular and genetic characteristics of the cancer process, and basic research related to new treatments for cancer. With direct links to the cancer centres across the province, discoveries at the Research Centre are quickly translated into clinical applications.

In 2005 the Canada Green Building Council certified the building had met LEED (Leadership in Energy and Environmental Design) Gold standards for its sustainable design, making it the first health-care facility in Canada to attain that distinction.

== Michael Smith Genome Sciences Centre ==
The Michael Smith Genome Sciences Centre, named for Nobel laureate Michael Smith, is located nearby the L. J. Blackmore Cancer Research Centre.

== See also ==
- BC Cancer Agency
- BC Cancer Foundation
- Provincial Health Services Authority
