= Tiko Kerr =

Canadian artist

- Born: Edmonton, Alberta
- Known for: Painter
- Website: tikokerr.com

Tiko Kerr, born in 1953, is a Canadian artist known for his painting and his HIV/AIDS advocacy.

== Career ==
Kerr began his career as a painter in 1984. In 2008 he held the exhibition The Lazarus Tree: New Works by Tiko Kerr, featuring the eponymous painting among the works shown. In 2015 Kerr exhibited a survey of unreleased paintings entitled The Past is Present, many of which focused on his time living abroad during the 1980s, in addition to pieces derived from the cityscape of Vancouver, covering his career since its beginning in 1984. In 2012 Kerr was featured in the documentary film Cue the Muse.

In 2016 a film about his work was made, entitled Artist. Activist. Tiko Kerr. Later that year he also produced the exhibition Body Language, in which his works focused on painting hooded and shrouded human figures. The inspiration behind the series of works came from the public debate over the wearing of niqabs in government spaces during the mid-2010 Canadian elections.

In 2017 Kerr produced the solo exhibition Mythic Proportions: The Politics of Seeing, shown in Vancouver. Works for the show included mixed media and his first use of paper collages, revolving around the theme of pareidolia. Kerr has also collaborated with organizations such as the Ballet BC on set designs and other artistic endeavours. He has also produced and shown works digitally through sites like Instagram. He has also created public murals in Canadian cities such as Calgary and Vancouver. In addition to his solo exhibitions, Kerr has also shown works as a part of group exhibitions. Kerr is, according to the Vancouver Westender, "best known for his figurative and abstract acrylic-based paintings; often vibrant images of Vancouver's iconic urban and natural locales and architecture".

== Activism ==
Kerr was diagnosed as HIV positive in 1985. Since his participation in a clinical trial in 2005, the disease is now undetectable in his blood. Since the late 1980s, he has been an activist on HIV/AIDS, as well as affordable housing and issues affecting indigenous people. Kerr is a resident of West End, Vancouver and a member of West End Neighbours, which campaigns for greater consultation regarding the city's Short Term Incentives for Rental programme. Kerr has also provided art work for medical centers, including the BC Children's Hospital.
