= Robert S. Hogg =

Canadian HIV researcher, demographer, and professor

- Born: Canada
- Education: Australian National University
- Known for: Improving the Care of HIV Persons
- Awards: Order of Canada, Royal Society of Canada
- Scientific career
- Fields: HIV/AIDS
- Workplaces: British Columbia Centre for Excellence in HIV/AIDS

Robert S. Hogg CM is an HIV researcher focused on improving outcomes for people living with HIV/AIDS through the understanding of barriers to accessing HIV testing, treatment and care in Canada and globally. He is a senior research scientist and the former Director of the HIV/AIDS Drug Treatment Program at the B.C. Centre for Excellence in HIV/AIDS. He is a Simon Fraser University Distinguished Professor (the first to receive the title) and the Associate Dean of Research of the faculty of Health Sciences. He is a prolific and highly cited author with an H-index of 111 and over 1000 peer-reviewed papers. He is both a Member of the Order of Canada and a Fellow of the Canadian Academy of Health Sciences.

His research includes, access to care including at risk-groups including those that use drugs or men that have sex with men, antiretroviral therapy, and aging with HIV.

== Access to Care ==
Dr. Hogg's research has extensively covered access and barriers to care such as his 1998 senior author paper looking at barriers to the use of free antiretroviral therapy in injection drug users.

== Antiretroviral Therapy ==
Hogg has published extensively on antiretroviral therapy from their inception to current times such as looking at antiretrovirals' effect on mortality.

=== Drug resistance ===
Hogg's 2006 paper demonstrated that resistance to NNRTIs resulted in greater mortality than the development of resistance to protease inhibitors.

=== Treatment as prevention strategy ===
Hogg, Julio Montaner and others are original authors of the Treatment as prevention strategy (TasP). The Treatment as Prevention strategy is based on the premise that administering highly active antiretroviral therapy to all medically eligible HIV-positive individuals will decrease transmission rates.
