= British Columbia Children's Hospital =

B.C. Children's Hospital
- Provincial Health Services Authority

Geography
- Location: 4480 Oak Street; Vancouver, British Columbia, Canada; V6H 3N1
- Coordinates: 49°14′40″N 123°07′32″W

Organisation
- Care system: Medicare
- Type: Tertiary pediatric care
- Affiliated university: UBC Faculty of Medicine

Services
- Emergency department: Level I Pediatric Trauma Centre

Helipads
- Helipad: TC LID: CAK7

History
- Founded: 1928

Links
- Website: www.bcchildrens.ca
- Other links: BC Women's Hospital & Health Centre

British Columbia Children's Hospital is a medical facility located in Vancouver, British Columbia, and is an agency of the Provincial Health Services Authority. It specializes in health care for patients from birth to 16 years of age (possibly longer if followed by a specialist team). It is also a teaching and research facility for children's medicine. The hospital includes the Sunny Hill Health Centre, which provides specialized services to children and youth with developmental disabilities aged birth to 16 years.

The hospital employs more than 650 doctors.

The hospital is adjacent to the B.C. Women's Hospital & Health Centre. Previously, the two were officially a single organization and were known as the Children's & Women's Health Centre of British Columbia.

Working with the hospital and the community, the BC Children's Hospital Foundation raises funds to support and enhance the delivery of pediatric care in British Columbia. The Foundation provides funding to B.C. Children's Hospital, as well as its sister facilities, the BC Children's Hospital Research Institute, to support research into childhood diseases, the purchase of medical equipment, and a range of child health education and training programs.

== History ==
B.C. Children's Hospital's roots go back to the establishment of a fund for cripple children by the B.C. Women's Institute in 1923. In 1928, Vancouver's Crippled Children's Hospital admitted its first patient at its Hudson Street location. In 1933, a new Crippled Children's Hospital opened on West 59th Avenue. In 1947, it was renamed Children's Hospital "to exemplify the growing awareness that children are not defined by their illnesses."

In 1977, ground was broken at the hospital's current location at West 28th Avenue and Oak Street, some time after the Children's Hospital and the Health Centre for Children had agreed to the construction of a joint facility in 1964. Construction was completed in 1982 at a cost of $60 million. The 29,730 square-metre facility housed 250 acute care beds, an adolescent unit, a modern isolation facility, a rehabilitation unit, a 10-bed psychiatric unit and a 60-bed special care nursery.

In 1985, the Children's Variety Research Centre opened, showing the increasing importance placed on medical research.

In 2002, the Medical Day Unit was expanded from four to twelve beds, providing family-centred care for children with complex medical problems.

In 2003, a $28 million expansion saw the opening of a new Ambulatory Care Building, for the increasing numbers of patients not needing to stay overnight. The building tripled the number of clinic rooms available on site for patients and staff, and houses 24 pediatric specialty medical and surgical clinics. The architects state that the building "is nearly 40% more efficient than the National Energy Code called for when it was built. Sustainable design features include orientation toward solar exposure, maximization of natural ventilation and natural daylight, concourse ventilation, insulated north walls, reduction in electrical power consumption through daylighting, task lighting, and light and occupancy sensors." The project also involved the nearby B.C. Women's Hospital & Health Centre's new Maternity and Ambulatory Program Clinics, Child and Adolescent Psychiatry, and the Emergency renovation and expansion.

In 2005, two inpatient units were upgraded and modernized in a $6.9-million project. In 2007, the oncology unit was redeveloped and renamed the Djavad Mowafaghian Wing, after its donor provided $6 million for the project.

In 2007, a new $19-million Mental Health Building opened. "It was the first freestanding facility of its kind dedicated to youth mental health in Canada. The modernized 4-story facility serves children and adolescents with serious mental health challenges from all across the province. Services such as emergency care, long term psychiatric care, an outreach program, as well as a significant area for assessment and training are provided".

In 2008, the Pediatric Intensive Care Unit (PICU) was renovated in a $4.4-million project to enhance family and staff areas and improve the unit's capacity to care for children who require strict isolation. The British Columbia Ministry of Health Services also provided $2.8 million for renovations to the radiology department and new diagnostic equipment, two molecular-imaging gamma cameras: "One camera is a hybrid SPECT/CT, a gamma camera combined with a six-slice CT scanner that provides overlaid images. These fused images provide physicians with a more accurate picture of what's going on inside patients, enabling more effective treatment. For many patients, it can mean one hospital visit instead of two."

In 2014, construction began on the new Teck Acute Care Centre, a $676 million project in three phases to build "an eight-storey facility, approximately 59,400 square metres (640,000 square feet) in size. The facility was designed to Leadership in Energy and Environmental Design (LEED) Gold standard and include extensive use of wood, consistent with the Province of B.C.'s Wood First Act." The building "will be a bright, modern facility with single-occupant patient rooms, access to natural light and gardens. It includes medical/surgical inpatient units, an emergency department, medical imaging and procedural suites, a hematology/oncology department and a pediatric intensive care unit for BC Children's Hospital." On October 29, 2017 the Teck Acute Care Centre, which had been built by Balfour Beatty, was officially opened. Teck Resources Limited earned its name on the new building due to its $25 million donation to BC Children's Hospital Foundation.

In May 2019, the name for the building that houses its mental health programs and resources changed to The Healthy Minds Centre.

In September 2020, the new Sunny Hill Health Centre, which provides specialized developmental assessments and rehabilitation care to children, youth and their families from across B.C., opened at the site. The space is 10,163 square metres (or 33,343 square feet), has 53 designated assessment rooms in the outpatient clinics, many of which have observation capacity, 14 private inpatient rooms, with adjoining private washrooms and space for families to visit and sleep, with ability to expand to 18 if needed. The space also features a fully accessible pool with movable floors, an open-concept gym with a fun, multi-purpose therapy environment and seamless access to a patio, an interactive garden for mobility training and relaxation, a high-tech motion analysis lab, and a family-focused lounge with space for child play. The building also has spaces specifically designed to accommodate the needs of children and youth who have hearing, visual and sensory disabilities or sensitivities. This centre was part of the third and final phase of the $676-million BC Children's and BC Women's Redevelopment Project. Sunny Hill had previously been located in East Vancouver since 1961.

In May 2022, the BC Government approved a business plan for a new centre for children and youth with complex health-care needs, to be built at the former Sunny Hill Health Centre site in East Vancouver. The centre will be for patients up to 19 years old who are living with complex, chronic conditions and have difficulty performing routine daily and typical childhood activities without assistance, have significant caregiving requirements and frequently use the provincial health-care system. A 74-space child care centre will also be built on the site, which will be operated independently from the complex-care centre.

== Facilities ==
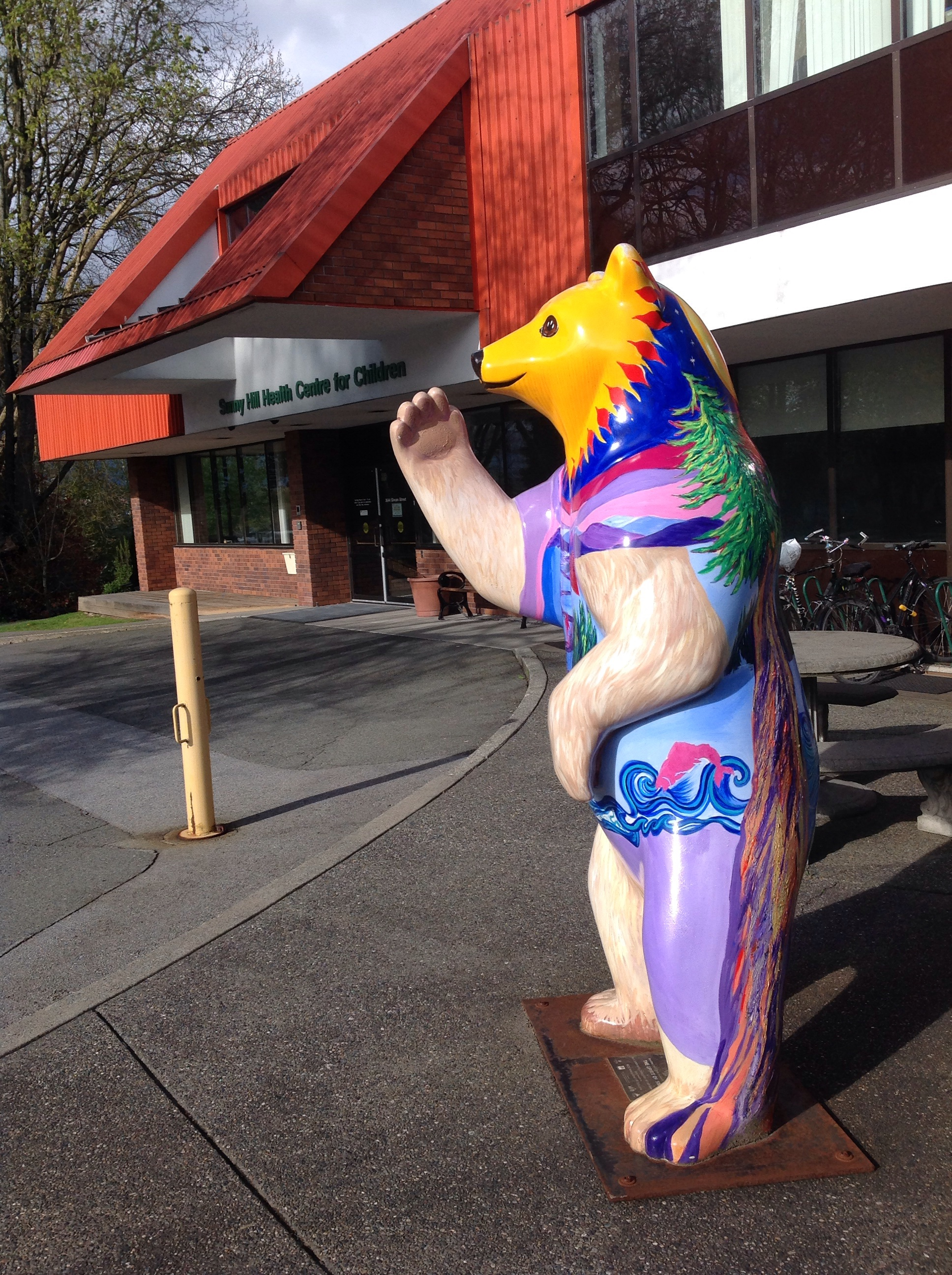

B.C. Children's Hospital offers a broad range of inpatient, outpatient and tertiary care for children from birth to adolescence. This includes clinics, emergency services, pediatric health care, surgery, intensive care, transplants, genetics, and an HIV centre. The site sees 7000 surgical visits a year. Emergency department staff care for 49,000 patients (visits) a year. Pediatric ICU sees 900 admissions a year.

B.C. Children's Hospital is affiliated with the UBC Faculty of Medicine and serves as a teaching hospital for infant and pediatric care. B.C. Children's Hospital and B.C. Women's Hospital & Health Centre are also the home of the BC Children's Hospital Research Institute.
