= St. Paul's Hospital (Vancouver) =

- Providence Health Care
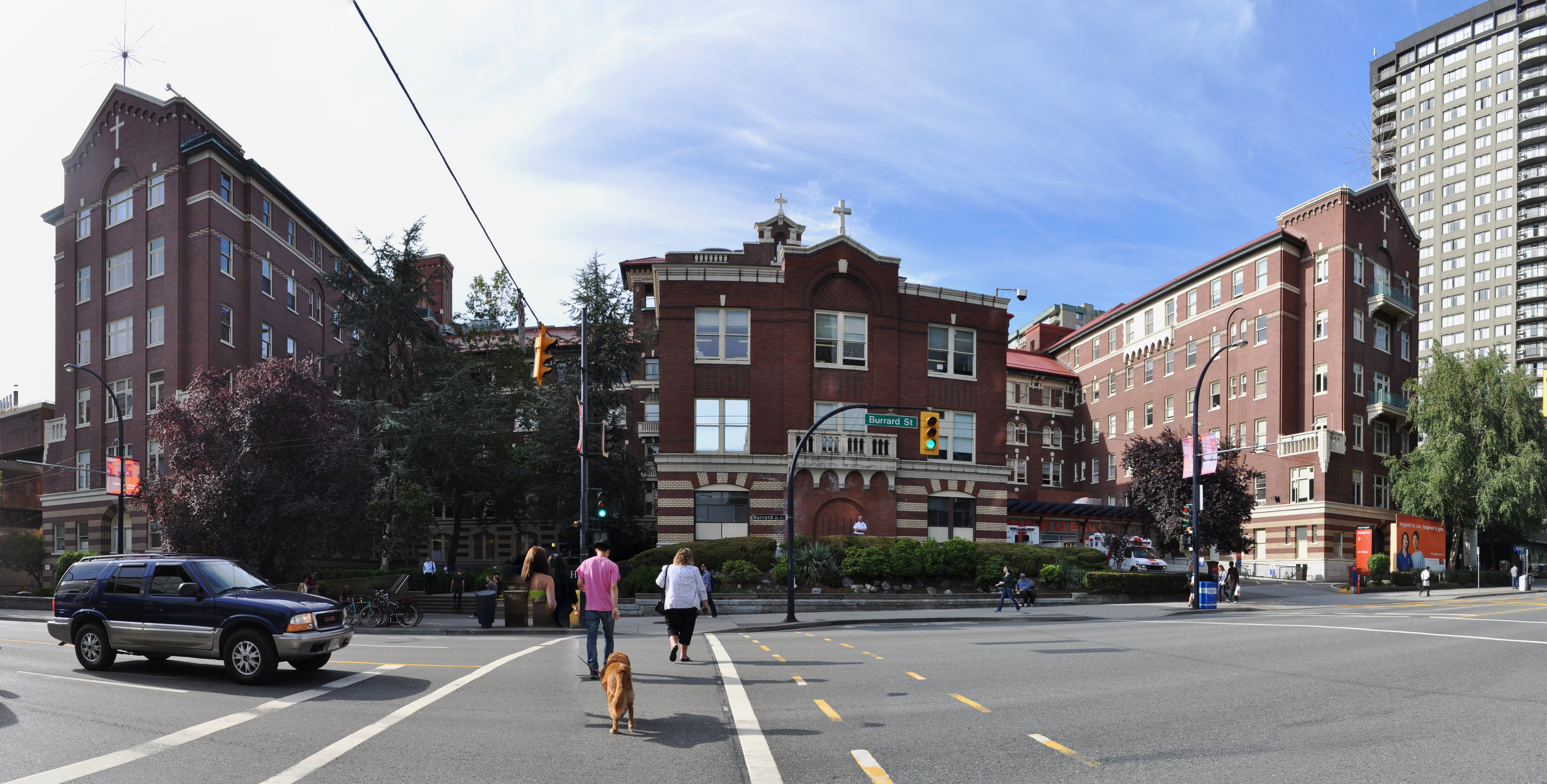

- Location in Downtown Vancouver

Geography
- Location: 1081 Burrard Street, Vancouver, British Columbia, Canada
- Coordinates: 49.280431°N 123.127887°W

Organization
- Care system: Medicare (Canada)
- Type: Teaching, Academic
- Affiliated university: UBC Faculty of Medicine

Services
- Emergency department: Yes, Level III trauma centre

History
- Founded: 1894

Links
- Website: www.providencehealthcare.org/hospitals-residences/st-paul%27s-hospital

St. Paul's Hospital is an acute care hospital located in downtown Vancouver, British Columbia, Canada. It is the oldest of the 18 health care facilities operated by Providence Health Care, a Roman Catholic faith-based care provider.

St. Paul's is open to patients regardless of their faith and is home to many medical and surgical programs, including cardiac services and kidney care including an advanced structural heart disease program and North America's largest addiction fellowship program. It is also the home of the Pacific Adult Congenital Heart Clinic. It is one of the teaching hospitals of the University of British Columbia Faculty of Medicine. Approximately 4,000 people work at St. Paul's Hospital.

On August 12, 2020, it was announced that the hospital's land in downtown Vancouver was sold to Concord Pacific for nearly $1 billion. Providence Health Care stated that the proceeds from the sale would go to the construction of the new St. Paul's Hospital in the False Creek Flats neighborhood, which is expected to open in 2027.

== History ==
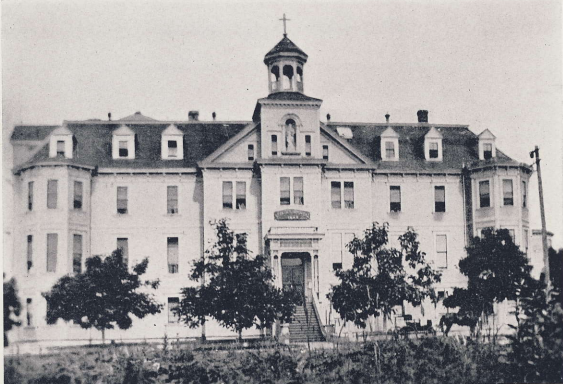
St Paul's Hospital in 1894

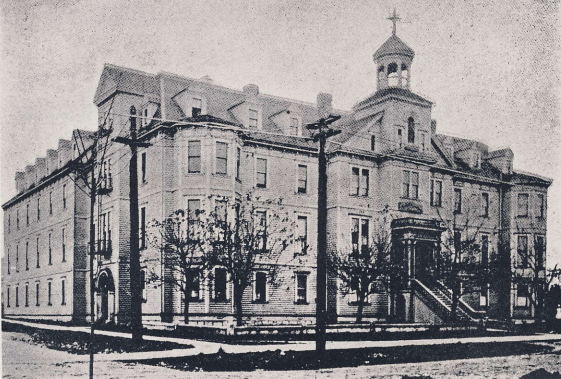
St Paul's Hospital in 1906

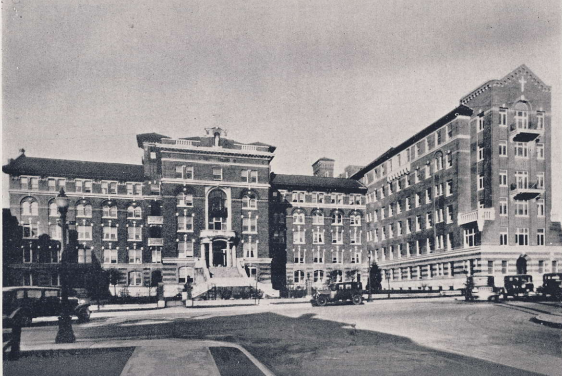
St Paul's Hospital in 1931

The original St. Paul's Hospital was founded in 1894 just eight years after the incorporation of the City of Vancouver. The hospital's origins are closely tied to the Sisters of Providence, a religious congregation founded in Montreal in 1843 by Mother Emilie Gamelin. This congregation was instrumental in establishing numerous schools, hospitals, orphanages, and homes for the aged across Canada, the United States, and other countries.

The 25-bed, 4-storey wood-frame building cost $28,000. It was designed and constructed by Mother Joseph of the Sacred Heart and named after the then-bishop, Paul Durieu of New Westminster. Mother Mary Fredrick from Astoria, Oregon was the first mother superior and administrator to lead its charge. In keeping with the philosophy of the Sisters of Providence, the new hospital was founded on the pledge of providing compassionate care for everyone in need – tested by a surge in Vancouver's growth brought on by the Klondike gold rush in the 1890s.

By 1906, it became one of the first hospitals to have its own X-ray machine. The hospital underwent several expansions to meet the growing needs of Vancouver's population, including the addition of 50 more beds in 1904 and the establishment of a School of Nursing in 1907. A significant development occurred in 1912, when the original building was demolished and replaced with a modern fireproof building, adding a new surgical department and 120 beds, at a construction cost of $400,000. Further expansions included the completion of the North Wing in 1931 and the South Wing in 1945, adding another 500 beds.

By the 1970s, St. Paul's had evolved into serving as a provincial referral and tertiary care centre for specialty services. This transformation necessitated further expansion, leading to the construction of two 10-story towers in 1983 and 1991, adjacent to the original building, now called the Centre Block. Father David Bauer, a Basilian priest at St. Mark's College, served as chaplain for the hospital from 1961 to 1988.

In 2010, the hospital established Angel's Cradle, the first modern baby hatch in Canada where mothers could anonymously provide their newborns to the hospital rather than abandon them elsewhere. Thirty seconds after a baby has been placed inside the modern version of a foundling wheel, a sensor alerts emergency staff. A social worker contacts the Ministry of Children and Family Development which then assumes responsibility for the baby. In its first five years, two healthy babies had been placed in the baby hatch.

St. Paul's operates a comprehensive Indigenous Wellness and Reconciliation program, led by Indigenous staff and peers and including a Sacred Space.

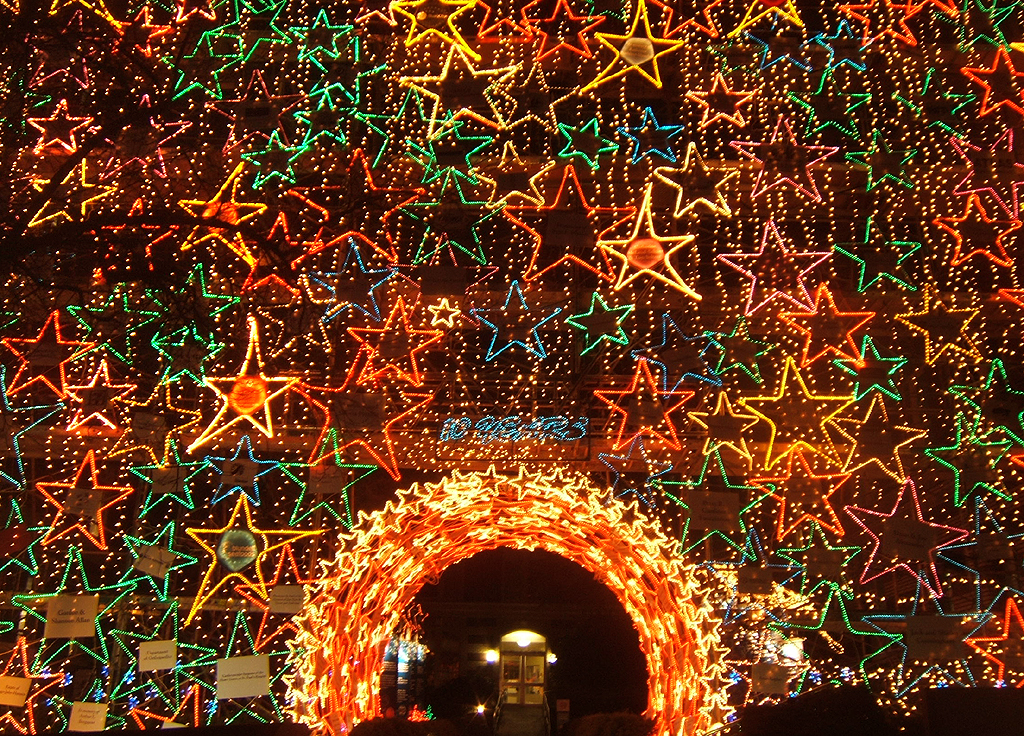
Christmas lights at St. Paul's Hospital

St. Paul's Hospital is listed on the City of Vancouver's Heritage Register but is not a designated heritage building and is not protected by legal statute. The building's future status after hospital services move to the new False Creek site is uncertain.

St. Paul's Hospital has faced challenges due to its outdated building design, which limits operational efficiency and lacks modern safety features like fire sprinklers and seismic upgrades. This limitation is evident in the spread of facilities across multiple buildings and levels, exemplified by the radiology department being located a significant distance from the emergency room.

== Redevelopment ==
In the 21st century, there has been ongoing advocacy for the redevelopment of the facility. A redevelopment plan was drafted in 2010. In 2012, Premier Christy Clark said at the hospital that business case and development plans would be completed in order to begin construction in 2016.

In 2015, questions continued to be raised whether the redevelopment would maintain the full range of existing services at the Burrard Street facility or move some services to a new location near False Creek. On April 13, 2015, Providence Health Care and the provincial government announced the hospital services would move to the new site and grow in size from more than 400 beds to 548 beds and an integrated health campus that includes a range of outpatient and ambulatory services:

- Full-service critical care hospital
- 24/7 primary care services
- Chronic disease management services
- Mental health and addictions beds and programs
- On-site residential care beds and programs
- Ambulatory services and outpatient clinics
- Non-acute medical services
- A low-risk birthing centre
- End-of-life care
- Research and teaching
- Community Care
- Community Outreach Programs

== St. Paul's School of Nursing ==
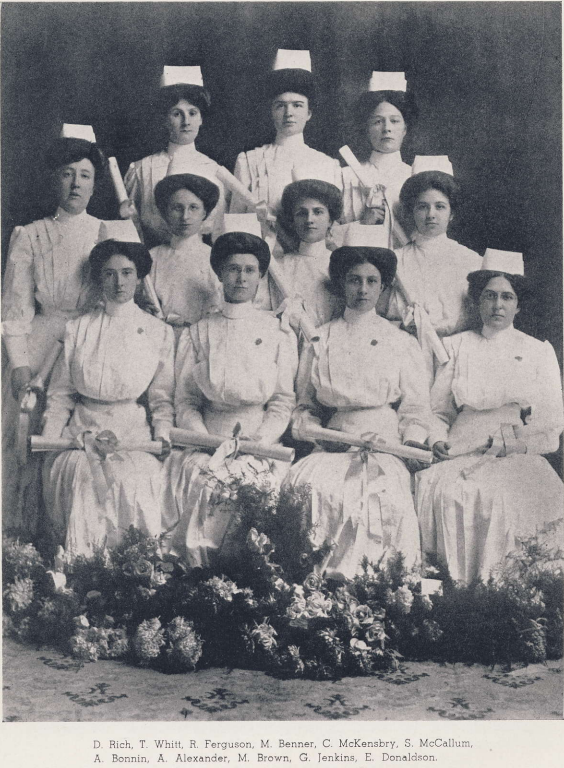
The first graduating nursing class of the St Pauls Hospital School of Nursing, in 1910

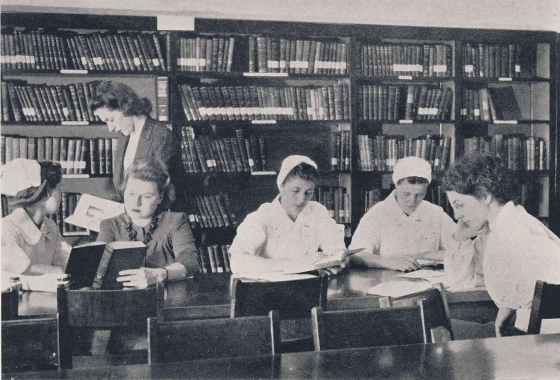
Nursing students studying at the St. Paul's Hospital School of Nursing Library

The school opened in 1907 in response to a shortage of nurses at the hospital. A public call was made to women between the ages of 20 and 30 years old, with “strong health, and good character”

Students could apply for admission to the Sister Superior, which following approval, would lead to a 1 month probationary period, during which the applicant had to obtain a letter from their pastor and physician attesting to “good moral character” and health, respectively. If accepted, students would receive room and board, a stipend and undergo a 3 year training program. At the end of the 3 year program, an examination was held, and if successful, candidates received a diploma with the seal of the hospital. Being run by nurses, the school and hospital was known to be unusually strict in protocol and decorum.

While initially new students would begin with nursing duties, and attend lectures as they could, this was re-organized by the 1940s. Students began with learning fundamentals of practical nursing for 4 months, Treatments were demonstrated by instructors, before being practiced on the wards. In addition, students took courses in psychology, anatomy and physiology, pharmacology, obstetrics and gynecology, as well as Ethics and Religion. Students could also take training in nursing of tuberculosis. After graduation, the school offered two postgraduate courses: Surgery, and Obstetrics.

In 1951, the school began accepting men. The school was closed in 1974, as the training of nurses shifted towards post secondary institutions.

== Research at St. Paul's ==
St. Paul's is home to the Providence Healthcare Research Institute and the Centre for Heart Lung Innovation.
