= BC Cancer Agency =

Coordinates: 49°15′44″N 123°07′03″W

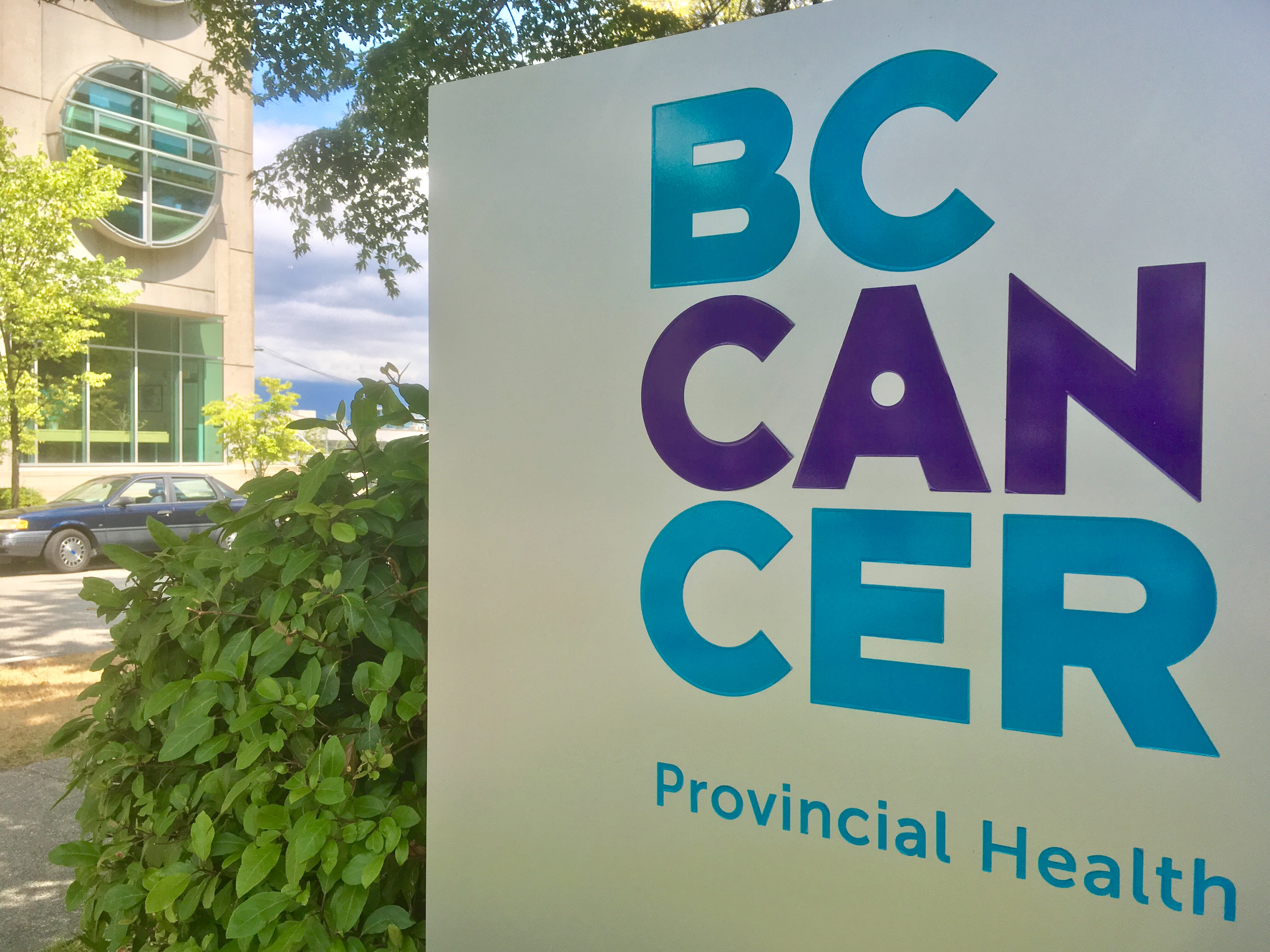

Geography
- Location: Vancouver, British Columbia, Canada

Organization
- Care system: Medicare

Services
- Emergency department: No

History
- Founded: 1938

Links
- Website: www.bccancer.bc.ca bccancerfoundation.com

BC Cancer is part of the Provincial Health Services Authority in British Columbia, Canada.

== Facilities ==
BC Cancer's first cancer treatment centre (then known as the British Columbia Cancer Institute) officially opened in Vancouver on November 5, 1938.

BC Cancer operates six regional cancer centres (in Abbotsford, Kelowna, Prince George, Surrey, Vancouver and Victoria) and the BC Cancer Research Centre, with departments in Vancouver and in Victoria.

All radiotherapy services in British Columbia are provided by the BC Cancer, as well as a majority of chemotherapy services. BC Cancer works with local health authorities across the province to provide cancer clinics in areas remote from the six main cancer centres, to cover rural British Columbia and the Yukon.

== Projects ==
In 2000, the agency partnered with the Fred Hutchinson Cancer Research Center to create the Chinese Women's Health Project that provides culturally competent outreach programs to increase cervical cancer screening rates among this population.

== Fundraising ==
The BC Cancer Foundation is the fundraising partner of BC Cancer.

Established in 1935, the BC Cancer Foundation is an independent charitable organization that raises funds to advance research innovation and accelerate access to world-class care for all residents of the province of British Columbia.

All donations to the BC Cancer Foundation stay in British Columbia to make a direct impact on residents in every corner of the province. Some of the achievements include: discovering and deploying the first effective prevention strategy for ovarian cancer, being the first cancer centre to effectively treat a patient based on the DNA of their cancer, and launching Canada's first province-wide lung cancer screening program.

The Foundation has offices in six of BC Cancer's regional centres: Abbotsford, Surrey, Kelowna, Victoria, Vancouver and Prince George.

=== History ===
In May 1935, the BC Cancer Foundation was founded to provide cancer care and treatment across B.C. The launch was announced at the Hotel Vancouver, and their first donation received was a $50 gift through a local women's community group. In 1938, a transformative $50,000 bequest from an anonymous woman enabled the conversion of a Vancouver hospital's intern residence into the province's first cancer treatment centre, which went on to care for 288 patients in its inaugural year.

In 1977, the BC Cancer Foundation contributed $2.3 million to establish British Columbia's first cancer research centre in a converted bakery on 601 West 10th Ave—now known as the L. J. Blackmore Cancer Research Centre. Since then, BC Cancer has established research facilities at all centres across the province, including the Deeley Research Centre in Victoria.

=== Fundraising Events ===
The BC Cancer Foundation is the beneficiary of major fundraising events. The Workout to Conquer Cancer is a 31-day challenge to move every day in May while fundraising.

The Tour de Cure is an annual cycling event that raises funds for the BC Cancer Foundation to support cancer research and patient care programs. The event takes place in British Columbia, and participants of all skill levels can choose to ride different routes of varying distances. It is the largest cycling fundraiser in the province. The inaugural Tour de Cure event was held virtually in August 2021 due to the pandemic, and helped raise over $5.5 million for the BC Cancer Foundation. In 2022, the event was held in-person for the first time at Chilliwack Heritage Park, raising $6.3 million with over 1100 cyclists attending. In 2023, 2,000 riders will be participating in the two-day event, which will take place on August 26 and 27 from Cloverdale to Hope. Notable corporate sponsors teams include Wheaton Precious Metals, KMPG, Royal Bank of Canada, Harbour Air, CTV, Ledcor, Deloitte, and RE/MAX. The Foundation has offices in six of BC Cancer's regional centres: Abbotsford, Surrey, Kelowna, Victoria, Vancouver and Prince George. On October 29, 2024, the BC Cancer Foundation announced the discontinuation of the event, citing increased costs, reduced revenue, and external risks, including extreme climate events and unpredictable weather that pose safety concerns. Over its 16-year history, the event generated more than $131 million in gross revenue for cancer research.
