= B.C. Women's Hospital & Health Centre =

- Provincial Health Services Authority

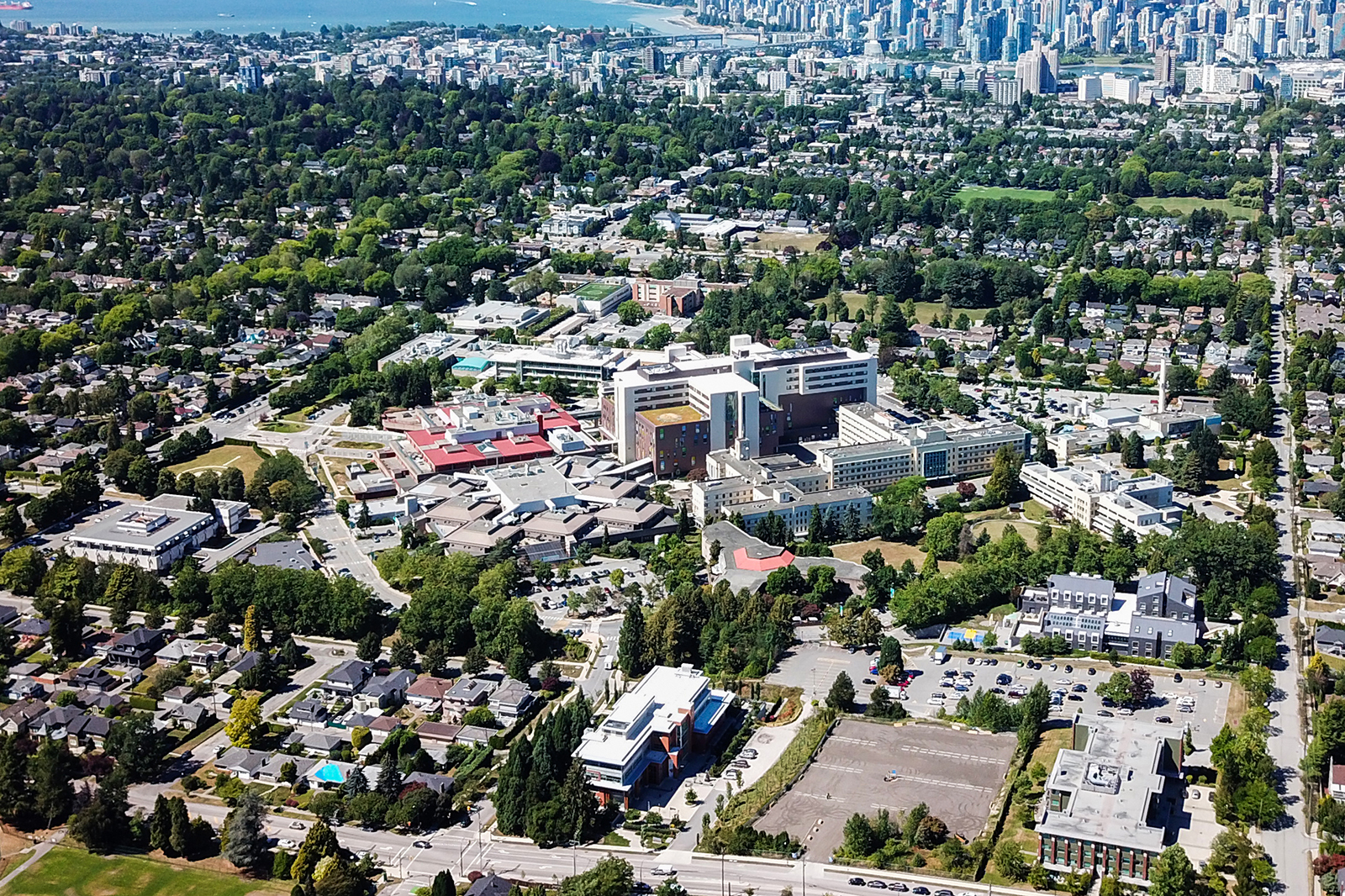

Geography
- Location: Oak Street, Vancouver, British Columbia, Canada
- Coordinates: 49.243611°N 123.124722°W

Organization
- Care system: Public Medicare (Canada) (MSP)
- Type: Provincial and teaching
- Affiliated university: University of British Columbia & Simon Fraser University

Helipads
- Helipad: TC LID: CAK7

History
- Founded: 1927 (as Grace Hospital)

Links
- Website: www.vch.ca/en/location/bc-womens-hospital-and-health-centre
- Lists: Hospitals in Canada

B.C. Women's Hospital & Health Centre, an agency of the Provincial Health Services Authority (PHSA), is a Canadian hospital located in Vancouver, British Columbia, Canada, specializing in women's health programs. It is the only facility in Western Canada dedicated to the health of women, newborns and families, and is the largest maternity hospital in the country. It is a teaching hospital and major provincial health care resource, and is a key component in women's health research.

BC Women's employs more than 1,000 full and part-time staff. More than 450 doctors work at the hospital.

== History ==
The former Salvation Army Grace Maternity Hospital began providing care in 1927 at Heather Street and West 29th Avenue. In 1982, both the Grace Maternity Hospital and Vancouver General Hospital's Willow Pavilion Maternity care moved to the current location at 4500 Oak Street, at which it shared the campus with Shaughnessy Hospital.

Following the closure of Shaughnessy Hospital in 1993, The Salvation Army withdrew administration in 1994 and the facility was renamed BC Women's Hospital & Health Centre.

On 25 October 2006, Felicia Simms delivered conjoined twins (Krista and Tatiana Hogan) at BC Women's Hospital & Health Centre. They are believed to be the first ever conjoined twins born in British Columbia.

Canada's first set of sextuplets, four boys and two girls, were born at the hospital on 6 and 7 January 2007. They were in the 25th week of gestation when born, or approximately 3 months premature.

In 2014, construction began on the new Teck Acute Care Centre, a $676 million project in three phases to build "an eight-storey facility, approximately 59,400 square metres (640,000 square feet) in size. The facility was designed to Leadership in Energy and Environmental Design (LEED) Gold standard and include extensive use of wood, consistent with the Province of B.C.'s Wood First Act." The building "will be a bright, modern facility with single-occupant patient rooms, access to natural light and gardens. It includes...a high-risk labour and delivery suite and a new neonatal intensive care unit for BC Women's Hospital + Health Centre." On 29 October 2017 The Teck Acute Care Centre, which had been built by Balfour Beatty, was officially opened.

In September 2020, 10 new single room birthing suites were opened, bringing the total of single room birthing suites to 27. These new rooms are part of an expansion of BC Women’s Cedar Birthing Suites, which also includes a new family lounge where family members and visitors can relax and wait, and where siblings can play.

== Specializations and services ==
Under the Provincial Health Services Authority, BC Women's Hospital & Health Centre has a mandate to serve women, babies and their families across B.C. Only 43 percent of patients reside in the Lower Mainland, while 57 per cent of patients live in other areas of B.C. With many specialized women's health services not available anywhere else in the province, BC Women's treats over 68,000 patients each year.

Its specialists and staff:

- deliver approximately 7,200 babies per year
- provide high risk maternity care (1,200 high risk premature + sick newborns in Neonatal Intensive Care annually)
- operate with 85 antepartum/postpartum beds, including 29 high risk beds, plus 9 delivery suites and 10 neonatal care nursery beds
- support low-risk mothers and families in 7 new single room maternity care rooms
- provide care for more than 42,500 in-patients visits each year
- see patients 24/7 at the Urgent Care Centre (pregnant women who are registered to deliver here, or who have delivered and up to six weeks post-birth

As a health centre, BC Women's provides care and treatment to over 19,000 outpatients each year through women's health services including:

- Maternity Ambulatory Program
- Provincial Milk Bank (serves 1,200 high risk premature and sick newborns in neonatal ICU care annually)
- The Oak Tree Clinic: Women & Children with HIV/AIDS
- Breast Health Program
- Reproductive Health
- Heartwood Centre — A 27-bed residential addiction treatment & rehab program
- Aboriginal Health Program
- Sexual Assault Program
- Continence Program
- Midwifery Program
- Integrated Gynecological Surgical Daycare

== The Foundation ==
BC Women's Health Foundation supports the capital equipment, diagnostic, patient care, research and education needs of the hospital and health centre through fund-raising, planned giving and corporate partnerships. Aurora Centre closed in August 2011. There is a new Heartwood program in its place.

== Women's Health Research Institute at BC Women's ==
In March 2005, the Women’s Health Research Institute (WHRI) was established by BC Women’s Hospital + Health Centre to enhance and galvanize the impact of women’s health research conducted at BC Women’s and throughout BC. A leading academic women’s and newborn health research centre embedded within the hospital. WHRI is devoted to improving the health and health care of girls and women through knowledge generation, serving as a catalyst for research in women’s health and supporting an expanding provincial and national network of women’s health researchers, policy makers and healthcare providers.
