= List of hospitals in British Columbia =

This is a list of hospitals in British Columbia, grouped by health authority and sorted by hospital name. This list does not include extended care facilities, health centres, or assisted-living facilities.

== Fraser Health ==
Fraser Health Authority is the largest health authority in British Columbia by population, and operates 13 hospitals in the Fraser Valley and Lower Mainland.

Facility name	Location	Coordinates
Abbotsford Regional Hospital and Cancer Centre	Abbotsford	49°02′21″N 122°18′39″W
Burnaby General Hospital	Burnaby	49°14′58″N 123°00′54″W
Chilliwack General Hospital	Chilliwack	49°09′59″N 121°57′46″W
Delta Hospital	Delta	49°05′08″N 123°03′40″W
Eagle Ridge Hospital	Port Moody	49°17′06″N 122°49′24″W
Fraser Canyon Hospital	Hope	49°22′34″N 121°25′24″W
Jim Pattison Outpatient Care and Surgery Centre	Surrey	49°10′46″N 122°49′59″W
Langley Memorial Hospital	Langley	49°05′37″N 122°36′43″W
Mission Memorial Hospital	Mission	49°08′06″N 122°19′51″W
Peace Arch Hospital	White Rock	49°01′47″N 122°47′32″W
Ridge Meadows Hospital	Maple Ridge	49°12′56″N 122°37′45″W
Royal Columbian Hospital	New Westminster	49°13′35″N 122°53′25″W
Surrey Memorial Hospital	Surrey	49°10′34″N 122°50′30″W

== Interior Health ==
Interior Health operates 22 hospitals in the BC Interior.

Facility name	Location	Coordinates
100 Mile District General Hospital	100 Mile House	51°38′18″N 121°17′29″W
Arrow Lakes Hospital	Nakusp	50°14′19″N 117°47′42″W
Ashcroft and District General Hospital	Ashcroft	54°44′14″N 121°16′17″W
Boundary Hospital	Grand Forks	49°01′48″N 118°28′07″W
Cariboo Memorial Hospital	Williams Lake	52°08′17″N 122°08′34″W
Creston Valley Hospital	Creston	49°05′54″N 116°30′28″W
Dr. Helmcken Memorial Hospital	Clearwater	51°38′47″N 120°01′06″W
East Kootenay Regional Hospital	Cranbrook	49°30′45″N 115°45′00″W
Elk Valley Hospital	Fernie	49°30′49″N 115°03′24″W
Golden and District General Hospital	Golden	51°17′48″N 116°58′05″W
Invermere and District Hospital	Invermere	50°30′24″N 116°02′00″W
Kelowna General Hospital	Kelowna	49°52′25″N 119°29′37″W
Kootenay Boundary Regional Hospital	Trail	49°06′11″N 117°42′06″W
Kootenay Lake Hospital	Nelson	49°29′42″N 117°17′05″W
Lillooet Hospital & Health Centre	Lillooet	50°41′22″N 121°56′19″W
Nicola Valley Hospital and Health Centre	Merritt	50°07′19″N 120°46′23″W
Penticton Regional Hospital	Penticton	49°28′55″N 119°34′41″W
Princeton General Hospital	Princeton	49°27′15″N 120°31′36″W
Queen Victoria Hospital	Revelstoke	50°58′39″N 118°11′26″W
Royal Inland Hospital	Kamloops	50°40′08″N 120°19′56″W
Shuswap Lake General Hospital	Salmon Arm	50°42′15″N 119°16′26″W
South Okanagan General Hospital	Oliver	49°11′00″N 119°32′18″W
St. Bartholomew's Hospital (defunct)	Lytton	50°13′55″N 121°34′52″W
Vernon Jubilee Hospital	Vernon	50°15′27″N 119°16′20″W

== Island Health ==
Island Health operates 12 hospitals on Vancouver Island.

Facility name	Location	Coordinates
Cowichan District Hospital	Duncan	48°47′09″N 123°43′22″W
Lady Minto Gulf Islands Hospital	Saltspring Island	48°51′43″N 123°30′30″W
Nanaimo Regional General Hospital	Nanaimo	49°11′05″N 123°58′10″W
North Island Hospital Campbell River & District	Campbell River	50°00′33″N 125°14′33″W
North Island Hospital Comox Valley	Courtenay	49°42′44″N 124°58′10″W
Port Hardy Hospital	Port Hardy	50°43′15″N 127°30′11″W
Port McNeill Hospital	Port McNeill	50°34′53″N 127°04′01″W
Royal Jubilee Hospital	Victoria	48°25′59″N 123°19′35″W
Saanich Peninsula Hospital	Saanichton	48°35′44″N 123°24′36″W
Tofino General Hospital	Tofino	49°09′06″N 125°54′31″W
Victoria General Hospital	Victoria	48°28′02″N 123°25′57″W
West Coast General Hospital	Port Alberni	49°14′54″N 124°46′54″W

== Northern Health ==
Northern Health operates 18 hospitals in Northern British Columbia.

Facility name	Location	Coordinates
Bulkley Valley District Hospital	Smithers	54°47′06″N 127°09′47″W
Chetwynd General Hospital	Chetwynd	55°41′44″N 121°38′12″W
Dawson Creek and District Hospital	Dawson Creek	55°44′59″N 120°14′10″W
Fort Nelson General Hospital	Fort Nelson	58°48′32″N 122°42′17″W
Fort St. John General Hospital	Fort St. John	56°14′47″N 120°50′27″W
G.R. Baker Memorial Hospital	Quesnel	52°58′57″N 122°30′01″W
Haida Gwaii Hospital - Xaayda Gwaay Ngaaysdll Naay	Daajing Giids	53°15′16″N 132°04′19″W
Kitimat General Hospital	Kitimat	54°03′26″N 128°39′14″W
Ksyen Regional Hospital	Terrace	54°30′36″N 128°35′45″W
Lakes District Hospital and Health Centre	Burns Lake	54°14′08″N 125°45′36″W
Mackenzie and District Hospital	Mackenzie	55°19′17″N 123°05′56″W
McBride and District Hospital	McBride	53°18′04″N 120°09′42″W
Northern Haida Gwaii Hospital and Health Centre	Masset	54°00′44″N 132°08′31″W
Prince Rupert Regional Hospital	Prince Rupert	54°18′16″N 130°19′53″W
St. John Hospital	Vanderhoof	54°01′42″N 124°00′33″W
Stuart Lake General Hospital	Fort St. James	54°26′45″N 124°15′40″W
University Hospital of Northern British Columbia	Prince George	53°54′49.47″N 122°45′52.79″W
Wrinch Memorial Hospital	Hazelton	55°15′34″N 127°39′05″W

== Vancouver Coastal Health ==
Vancouver Coastal Health operates nine hospitals in British Columbia.

Facility name	Location	Coordinates
Bella Coola General Hospital	Bella Coola	52°22′27″N 126°45′27″W
Lions Gate Hospital	North Vancouver	49°19′15″N 123°04′06″W
G. F. Strong Centre	Vancouver	
ƛ̓uxválásu̓ilas Heiltsuk Hospital	Bella Bella	52°09′41″N 128°08′39″W
qathet General Hospital	Powell River	49°51′04″N 124°31′12″W
Richmond Hospital	Richmond	49°10′08″N 123°08′48″W
Sechelt | shíshálh Hospital	Sechelt	49°28′34″N 123°44′54″W
Squamish General Hospital	Squamish	49°41′58″N 123°08′27″W
UBC Hospital	UBC Vancouver	49°15′51″N 123°14′45″W
Vancouver General Hospital	Vancouver	49°15′40″N 123°07′23″W

== Provincial Health Services Authority ==
Provincial Health Services Authority operates four specialty hospitals in British Columbia, all of which are located in the Lower Mainland.

Facility name	Location	Coordinates
B.C. Women's Hospital & Health Centre	Vancouver	49°14′39″N 123°07′27″W
BC Cancer Agency	Vancouver	49°15′44″N 123°07′03″W
British Columbia Children's Hospital	Vancouver	49°14′40″N 123°07′32″W
Riverview Hospital	Coquitlam	49°14′48″N 122°48′20″W

== Religious affiliation ==
Hospitals unaffiliated with a regional health authority also operate in British Columbia. These hospitals are typically affiliated with religious groups.

=== Providence Health Care ===
Providence Health Care is a Catholic health care provider that operates two hospitals in British Columbia, both of which are located in Vancouver. These hospitals are operated in cooperation with Vancouver Coastal Health and the Provincial Health Services Authority.

Facility name	Location	Coordinates
Mount Saint Joseph Hospital	Vancouver	49°15′28″N 123°05′43″W
St. Joseph's Hospital (defunct)	Comox	49°40′30″N 124°56′29″W
St. Paul's Hospital	Vancouver	49°16′50″N 123°07′41″W

=== Other ===
Facility name	Location	Operated By	Coordinates
Menno Hospital	Abbotsford	Mennonite Benevolent Society	49°02′17″N 122°18′42″W
Mount St. Francis Hospital	Nelson	Sisters of Saint Anne	49°30′30″N 117°16′11″W
