= Val Roddick =

Canadian politician

Member of the British Columbia Legislative Assembly for Delta South
- In office December 7, 1999 – May 12, 2009
- Preceded by: Fred Gingell
- Succeeded by: Vicki Huntington

Personal details
- Party: Liberal

Val Roddick is a former BC Liberal Member of the Legislative Assembly, in the province of British Columbia, Canada. She represented the riding of Delta South from 1999 to 2009. She was first elected in a Dec. 7, 1999 by-election to succeed Fred Gingell, before being re-elected in 2001 and 2005.

As chair of the Select Standing Committee on Health from 2001 to 2003 and again in 2004/05, Roddick produced reports on health care that included restructuring of health authorities in 2001. The downsizing of Delta Hospital in her riding by Fraser Health was a significant factor in the 2003 recall campaign against Roddick. After appearing to surpass the required 40 per cent of signatures, the recall petition was submitted to Elections BC which ruled the petition was unsuccessful due to disqualification of more than 3,100 signatures, mostly by ineligible voters.

On June 5, 2008, she announced that she would not seek re-election in the 2009 provincial election.

Her family established a farm fertilizer business in 1971.
