= Richard Bentley (disambiguation) =

Richard Bentley (1662–1742) was an English theologian, classical scholar and critic.

Richard Bentley may also refer to:

- Richard Bentley (writer) (1708–1782), son of the classical scholar; playwright and engraver, associate of Thomas Gray and Horace Walpole
- Richard Bentley (publisher) (1794–1871), British publisher
- Richard Bentley (athlete) (born 1960), Guamanian Olympic hurdler
- Richard Irvine Bentley (1854–1909), British surgeon, superintendent and medical officer
- Richard Bentley (MP), in 1420, Member of Parliament (MP) for Shrewsbury

== See also ==
- Dick Bentley (1907–1995), Australian comedian and actor
