= St. Joseph's Hospital =

St. Joseph's Hospital, Saint Joseph Hospital, St. Joseph Medical Center, etc. may refer to:

== Canada ==
- St. Joseph's Auxiliary Hospital, Edmonton Metropolitan Region, Alberta
- St. Joseph's General Hospital, Vegreville, Alberta
- Mount Saint Joseph Hospital, Vancouver, British Columbia
- St. Joseph's Health Centre, Toronto, Ontario
- St. Joseph's Healthcare Hamilton, Hamilton, Ontario
- St. Joseph's Hospital, Comox, British Columbia
- St. Joseph's Hospital (1876-1980s), Victoria, British Columbia. Now St. Joseph's Apartments, hospital operations moved to Victoria General Hospital (Victoria, British Columbia)
- St. Joseph's Hospital, London, Ontario.

== Denmark ==
- St. Joseph's Hospital, Aarhus

== Republic of Ireland ==
- St. Joseph's Hospital, Dublin
- St. Joseph's Hospital, Limerick
- St. Joseph's Hospital, Sligo

== Palestine ==
- St. Joseph's Hospital, Jerusalem

== Uganda ==
- St. Joseph's Hospital Kitgum, Kitgum, Northern Uganda

== United Kingdom ==
- St Joseph's Hospital, Newport, Wales

== United States ==
- St. Joseph's Hospital (Fairbanks, Alaska) (closed 1968)
- St. Joseph's Hospital and Medical Center, Phoenix, Arizona
- St. Joseph's Hospital (Tucson, Arizona)
- Providence Saint Joseph Medical Center, Burbank, California
- St. Joseph's Hospital (San Francisco, California) (closed 1979 and converted to condominiums c. 1985)
- Saint Joseph Hospital (Denver, Colorado)
- Saint Joseph's Hospital (Atlanta), Atlanta, Georgia
- OSF St. Joseph Medical Center, Bloomington, Illinois
- St. Joseph Hospital (Fort Wayne, Indiana)
- Cloud County Health Center (formerly St. Joseph's Hospital), Concordia, Kansas
- Saint Joseph Hospital (Lexington, Kentucky)
- St. Joseph Medical Center (Towson, Maryland)
- Lowell General Hospital, Massachusetts, one campus of which was known as St. Joseph's Hospital prior to 1992
- St. Joseph's Hospital (St. Paul, Minnesota)
- St. Joseph Medical Center (Kansas City, Missouri)
- St. Joseph's Hospital (Lewistown, Montana)
- St. Joseph's Hospital (Omaha, Nebraska)
- St. Joseph Hospital (Nashua, New Hampshire)
- St. Joseph's Regional Medical Center, Paterson, New Jersey
- St. Joseph's Hospital, Syracuse, New York
- St. Joseph's Medical Center (Yonkers, New York)
- Mission St. Joseph Hospital, Asheville, North Carolina
- St. Joseph's Hospital (Reading, Pennsylvania), now part of Penn State Milton S. Hershey Medical Center
- Saint Joseph's Hospital (Rhode Island), Providence, Rhode Island
- St. Joseph's Hospital (Memphis, Tennessee)
- St. Joseph Medical Center (Houston, Texas)
- PeaceHealth St. Joseph Medical Center, Bellingham, Washington
- St. Joseph Medical Center (Tacoma, Washington)
- St. Joseph's Hospital (Tampa, Florida)
- ShorePoint Health Port Charlotte, historically known as St. Joseph's Hospital

== See also ==
- Saint Joseph Health System
- St. Joseph Hospital light rail station, a light rail station of Circular light rail, Kaohsiung, Taiwan
