= Ridge Meadows Hospital =

Hospital in Maple Ridge, British Columbia, Canada

- Fraser Health

Geography
- Location: 11666 Laity St. Maple Ridge, British Columbia; Canada

Organisation
- Care system: Public medicare

Services
- Beds: 148

History
- Opened: March 1, 1958

Links
- Other links: Hospitals in Canada

Ridge Meadows Hospital is a 148-bed acute-care hospital located in Maple Ridge, British Columbia. The hospital is part of and operated by Fraser Health, the regional health authority for the Fraser Valley.

== History ==
First opened as Maple Ridge Hospital in 1958, the hospital originally had 63 beds.

In January 2009, the hospital opened a new $20.9-million emergency room and outpatient care centre expansion. As of March 2022, the hospital is in the midst of a long-term master planning process alongside Abbotsford Regional Hospital and Peace Arch Hospital.

=== Controversies ===
In November 2024, the hospital came under scrutiny for discharging an 86-year old blind women to a shelter in the Downtown Eastside neighborhood of Vancouver.
