= Delta Hospital =

- Fraser Health

Geography
- Location: 5800 Mountain View Boulevard; Delta, British Columbia, Canada; V4K 3V6
- Coordinates: 49.085885°N 123.061835°W

Organisation
- Care system: Medicare

Services
- Emergency department: Yes
- Beds: 64

History
- Founded: 1980

Links
- Website: www.fraserhealth.ca/Service-Directory/Locations/Delta/delta-hospital

Delta Hospital (originally known as 'Delta Centennial Hospital') is a community hospital, and Level V trauma centre owned and operated by the Fraser Health Authority in the city of Delta, British Columbia.

== Health services ==
Delta Hospital is a 58-bed acute-care hospital that provides inpatient and outpatient services to a catchment area of more than 100,000 residents of Ladner, Tsawwassen, North Delta and the Tsawwassen First Nation. The hospital employs more than 580 workers.

Health services include:

- 24/7 emergency care
- diagnostic imaging
- general surgery

About 5,000 day surgeries are performed at the hospital each year. About 34,000 patients visit the Emergency Department, 34,000 visit for ambulatory care, and 29,000 tested for diagnostic imaging annually. The laboratory performs about 500,000 tests annually.

The hospital also has Mountain View Manor on site that is a 92-bed residential care facility.

Neighbouring facilities are the Delta Hospice Society, the municipal City Hall and the Ladner Leisure Centre.

The annual operating budget for Delta Hospital is $43.2 million, an increase of 72 per cent since 2004/05 when the budget was $25.1 million. Fraser Health also funds $55 million in public health, mental health, home care, residential care, assisted living and hospice services in Delta community.

== Volunteers and community philanthropy ==
The hospital is supported by the Delta Hospital Foundation and by the Delta Hospital Auxiliary Society. The Auxiliary provides more than 11,000 volunteer hours and operates a gift shop near the hospital's main lobby. It has contributed more than $18 million for equipment and projects. It supports Mountain View Manor with $65,000 annually for recreation programs and music therapy.

Since 1988, the Foundation has raised more than $30 million for the hospital. The Foundation is currently campaigning to raise $7.5 million for the first phase of a 20-year expansion plan created in 2011.

== History ==
Planning for the hospital began in the early 1960s. A Fact-Finding Committee was established in 1967, the centennial year of the Confederation of Canada. In 1974, Delta Municipal Council and the Greater Vancouver Regional Hospital District (GVRHD) jointly purchased the property where the hospital is now located. The first care facility, Mountain View Manor a 75-bed residential care facility, was opened on 25 January 1977. The acute-care hospital building with 75 beds was constructed and then officially opened on 5 September 1980, one year after the centennial of the creation of the municipality of Delta.

The original governance of the Delta Centennial Hospital Society was transferred to the South Fraser Health Region. In 2001, governance transferred from the South Fraser Health Region to the newly created and larger Fraser Health Authority as part of a province-wide restructuring of health authorities by the provincial government. As part of the new authority's first hospital plans, the Delta facility was downgraded from acute-care to a sub-acute facility with 38 beds. A small intensive care unit was closed. There was also a proposal to close the Emergency Department during night-time hours that became part of a public controversy. The changes to the hospital status and capacity was a major factor in the high-profile campaign that attempted to recall Val Roddick who was the Member of the Legislative Assembly representing Delta South. The service changes also raised legal questions by community groups and by the municipal council.

In 2008, Health Minister George Abbott and Fraser Health restored the hospital's acute-care status and re-opened 12 beds. By 2008, the physical size of the Emergency Department had tripled due to financial donations from the Delta Hospital Foundation A 64-slice CT scanner was added in 2009.

In 2010, the municipal council approved a bylaw preventing pay parking at the hospital. It had been debated for six years and was the first of its kind in the Lower Mainland.

In 2015, a petition with more than 10,000 signatures was presented to the Legislative Assembly of British Columbia advocating for an additional $2 million to fund overnight operating rooms.

== Photo gallery ==
Statue of horse and farmer at Mountain View Manor

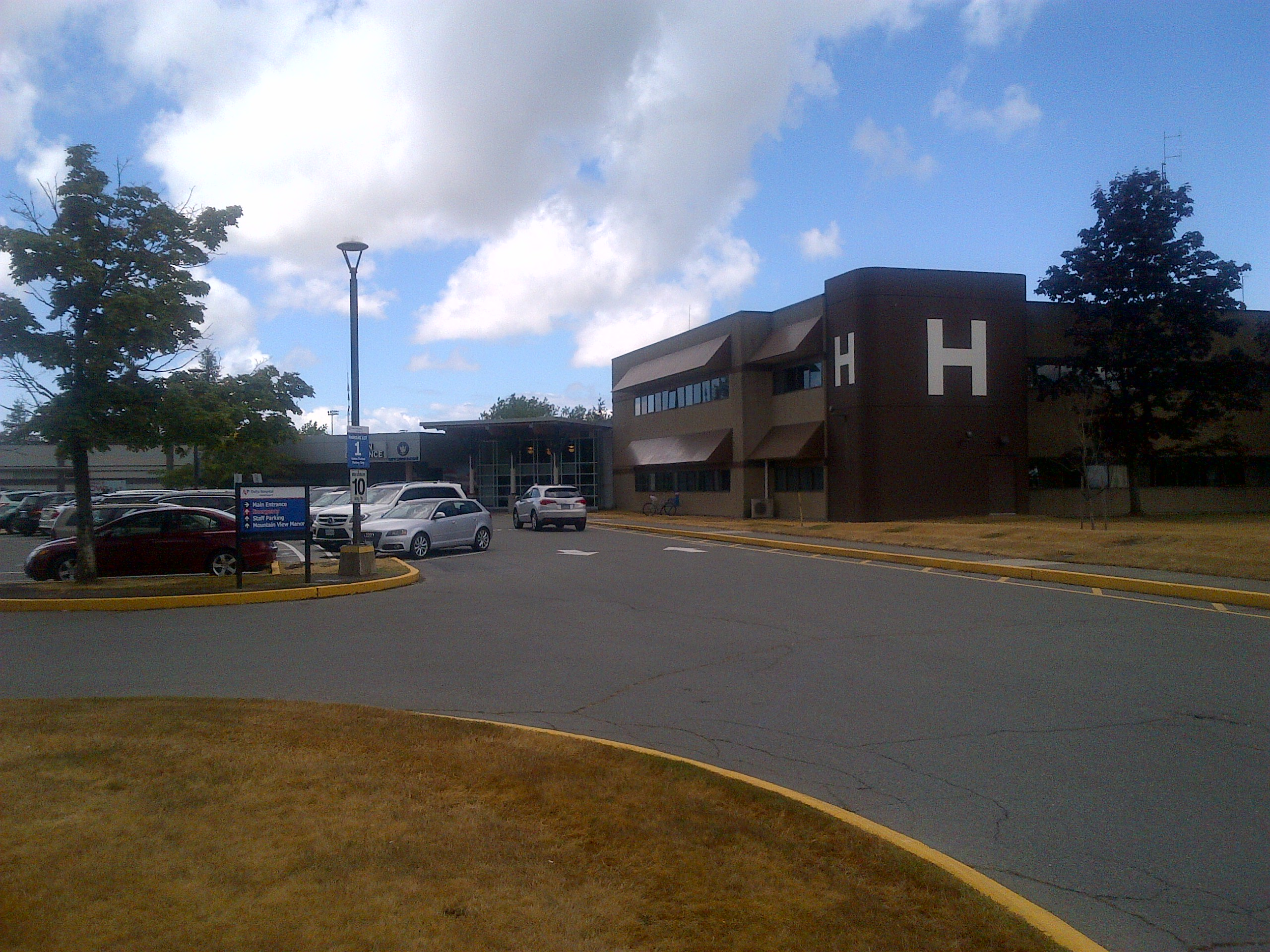
white Hospital icon on northern side of Delta Hospital building

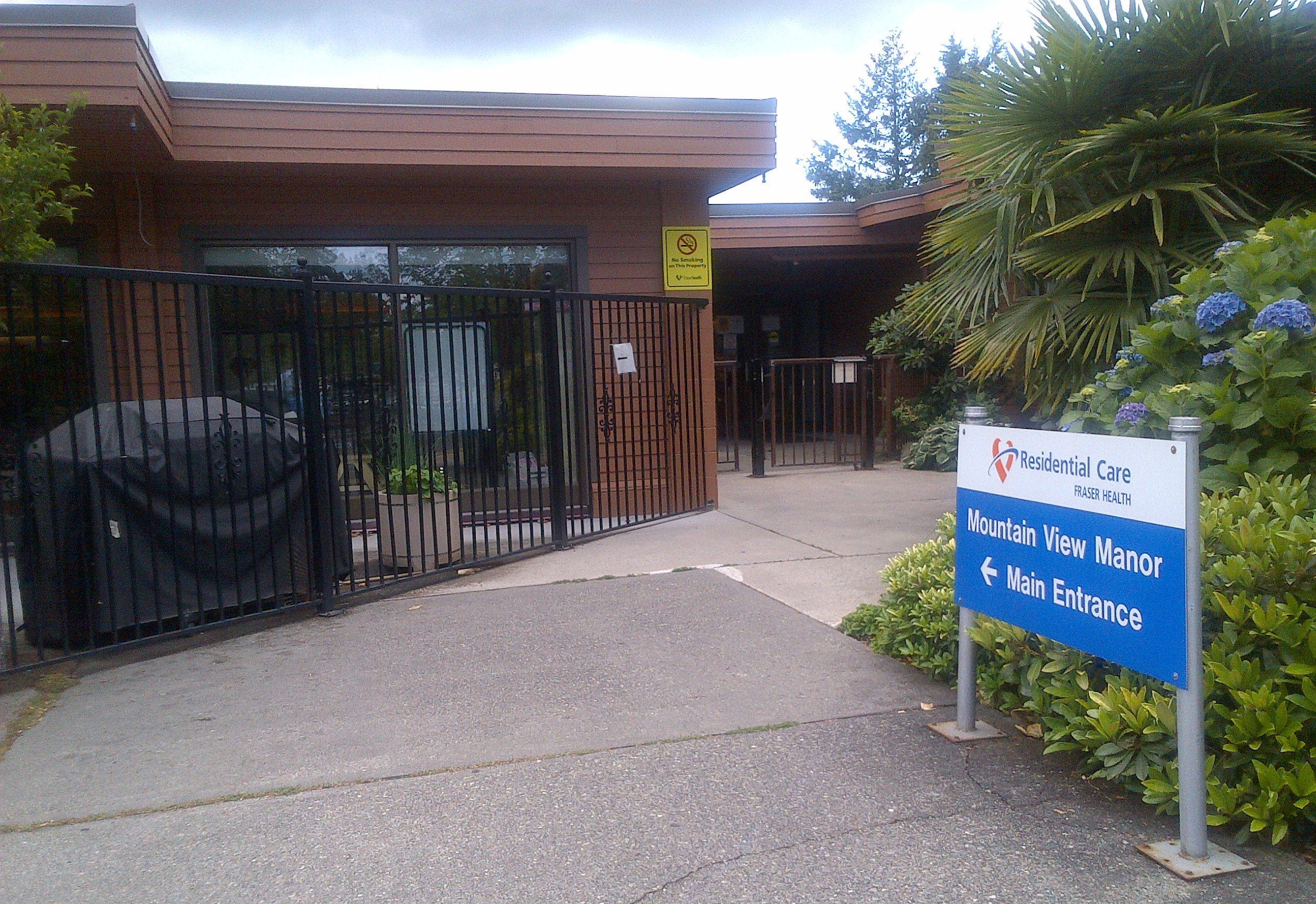
Entrance to Mountain View Manor at Delta Hospital

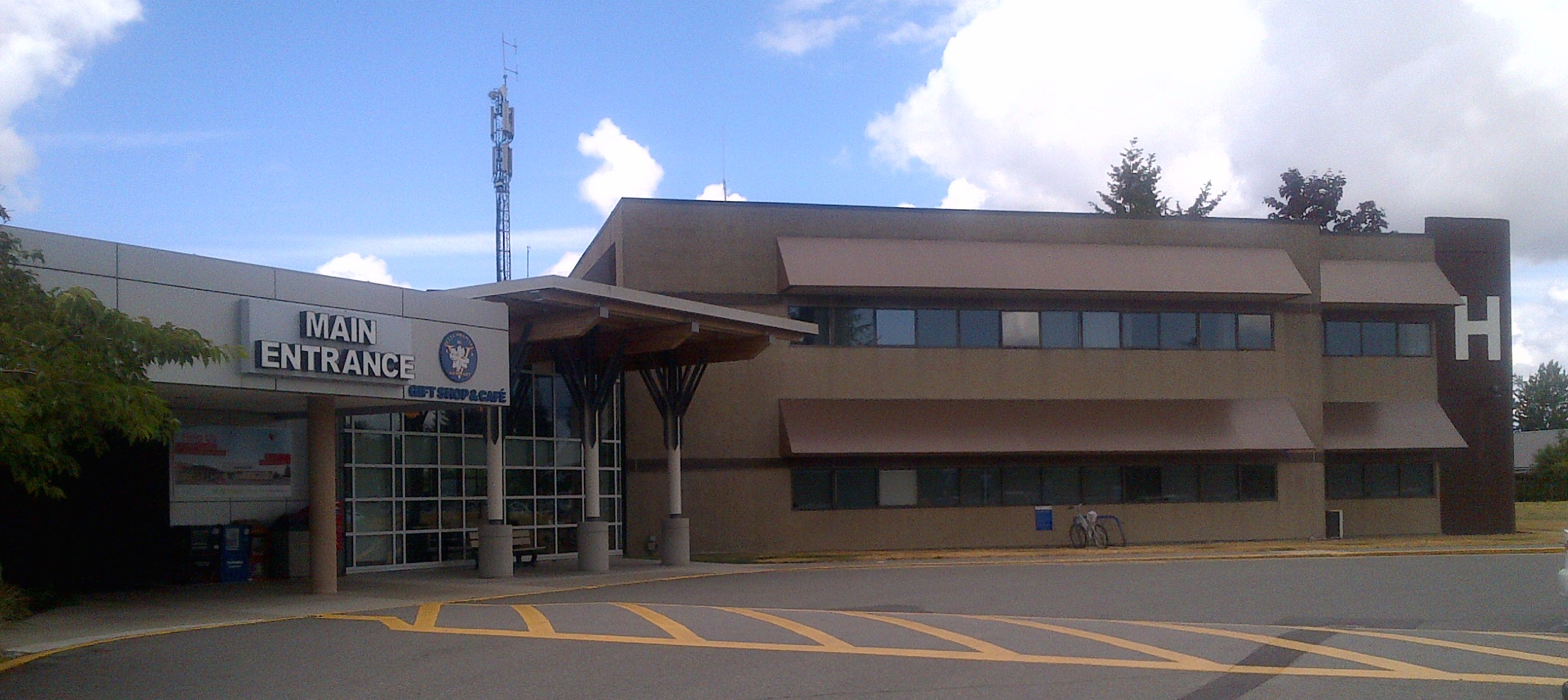
Main entrance to Delta Hospital in Ladner, British Columbia

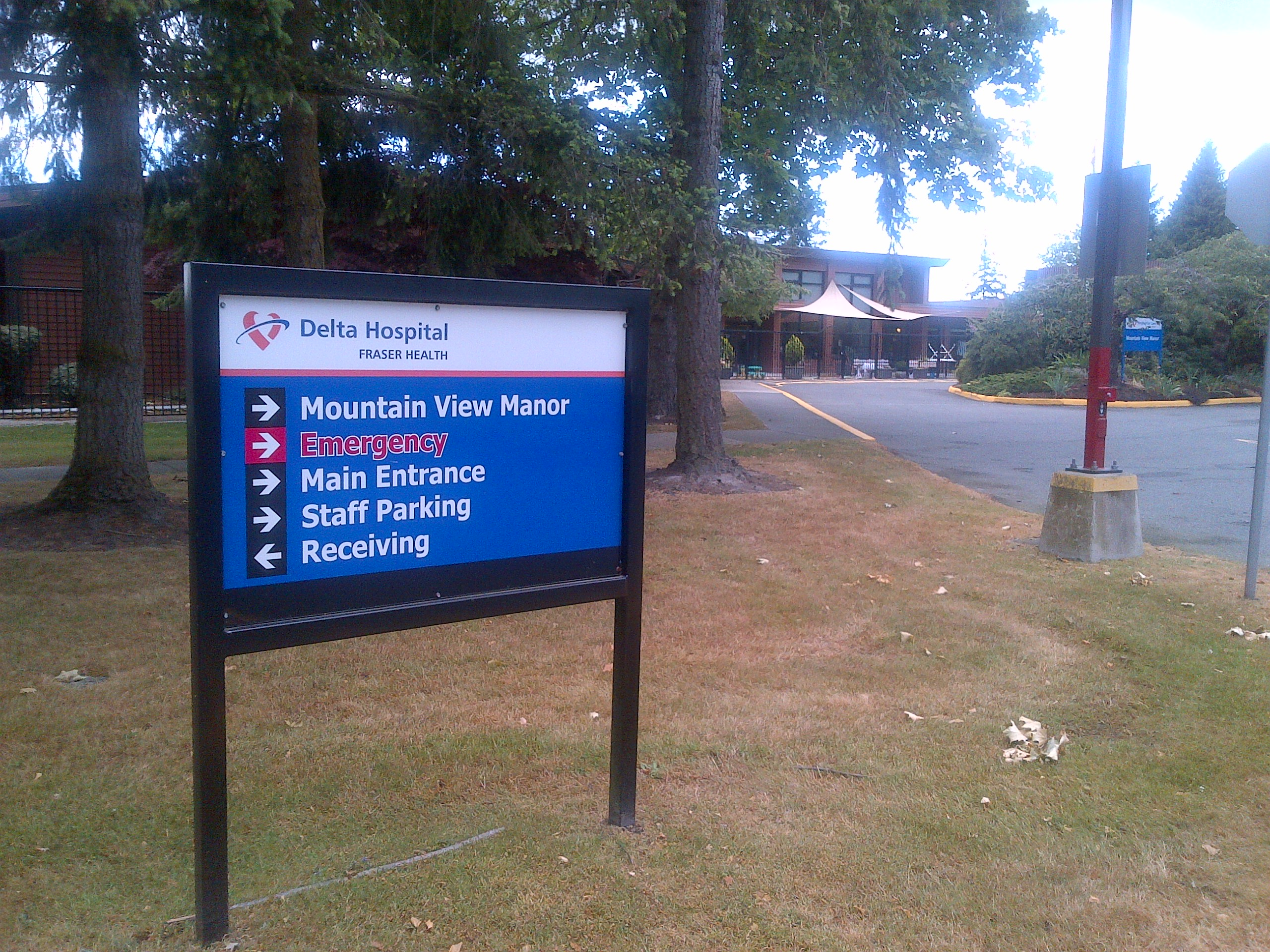
Direction signage outside of Delta Hospital in Ladner, British Columbia
