= Vicki Huntington =

Canadian politician

Victoria Huntington

Member of the British Columbia Legislative Assembly for Delta South
- In office May 12, 2009 – May 9, 2017
- Preceded by: Val Roddick
- Succeeded by: Ian Paton

Personal details
- Party: Independent

Victoria "Vicki" Huntington is a Canadian politician who served in the Legislative Assembly of British Columbia from 2009 until 2017 as an independent for Delta South.

== Education and early career ==
Huntington is a native of Vancouver, British Columbia, and has a degree in political science from the University of British Columbia. Much of her early career was spent in the RCMP, where she worked with the RCMP Security Service for most of the 1970s. Prior to joining the force, she was commissioned a first lieutenant in the Canadian Army Intelligence Corps (Res).

Following her years with the Security Service, Huntington served as band manager for the Gitanmaax Indian Reserve in Hazelton. She later worked as a policy assistant to the federal Minister of Indian Affairs and Northern Development, as a member of the Nisga’a Task Group, and as vice chair of the Lower Mainland Treaty Advisory Committee (LMTAC) and its representative on the Provincial Treaty Negotiating Team.

During her years in Ottawa, Huntington also served as executive assistant and acting chief of staff to the Solicitor General of Canada and to the Minister of National Revenue. She was also involved in various capacities with the Progressive Conservative Party of Canada. She returned to British Columbia in 1988 as the director of the Federal Ministers’ Regional Offices at Canada Place in Vancouver.

Huntington received an award from the Delta Farmland and Wildlife Trust for exceptional service.

== Political career ==
A resident of Ladner (Delta), British Columbia, Huntington was first elected in 1993 to Delta Municipal Council and returned to council at or near the top of the polls in the four subsequent municipal elections. She declined to run again in 2008.

Huntington ran in the 2009 general election. She finished a close second in initial results on election night, with opponent Wally Oppal leading by a margin of just two votes over Huntington. This result was subject to an automatic judicial recount because the margin of victory was fewer than one-500th of all votes cast. On May 26, 2009, the recount revealed that Huntington had defeated Oppal by 32 votes, to become the first independent MLA elected to the B.C. provincial legislature since the general election of 1949.

Huntington was elected to a second term in the 2013 election with an increased plurality. She was the first woman to be re-elected as an independent MLA in the province's history.

Huntington had stated in May 2016, that she was "not ready to retire", but later changed her mind in January 2017 citing health concerns and decided not to seek a third term.

== Post-political career ==
Huntington endorsed Green Party candidate Peter van der Velden for Delta South in the 2020 election.

== Electoral record ==
2013 British Columbia general election: Delta South
Party	Candidate	Votes	%	±%	Expenditures
Independent	Vicki Huntington	11,376	47.80	+5.17	$79,284
Liberal	Bruce McDonald	8,721	36.65	−5.85	$107,153
New Democratic	Nic Slater	3,700	15.55	+3.17	$35,818
Total valid votes		23,797	100.00		
Total rejected ballots		97	0.41		
Turnout		23,894	68.29		
Source: Elections BC

B.C. General Election 2009: Delta South
Party	Candidate	Votes	%	±	Expenditures
Independent	Vicki Huntington	9,977	42.63%		$61,113
Liberal	Wally Oppal	9,945	42.50%		$201,544
New Democratic	Dileep Athaide	2,940	12.38%		$30,486
Green	Duane Laird	555	2.24%	–	$362
Independent	John Shavluk	60	0.26%		$250
Total Valid Votes		23,477	100%		
Total Rejected Ballots		69	0.29%		
Turnout		23,546	68.59%		

B.C. General Election 2005: Delta South
Party	Candidate	Votes	%	±	Expenditures
Liberal	Val Roddick	9,112	37.48%		?
Independent	Vicki Huntington	8,043	33.08%		$23,746
NDP	Dileep Joseph Anthony Athaide	5,828	23.97%		$19,996
Green	Duane Laird	1,131	4.65%	–	$1,500
Marijuana	Julian Bellamy Wooldridge	139	0.57%		$100
Independent	George Mann	58	0.24%		$9,901
Total Valid Votes		24,311	100%		
Total Rejected Ballots		88	0.36%		
Turnout		24,399	70.81%		

== Family ==
Huntington's father Ron Huntington was elected to the House of Commons of Canada three times as a Progressive Conservative, in 1974, 1979, and 1980, representing the electoral district of Capilano on metro Vancouver's north shore. In 1979, he served as minister of state for small business in the government of Joe Clark.
