= Saint Joseph Health System =

Saint Joseph Health System, St. Joseph's Health System, etc. may refer to:

- St. Joseph's Health System, a Catholic hospital network in Ontario, Canada
- Several constituent networks of Trinity Health, a Catholic hospital network in the United States, including:
  - Saint Joseph Mercy Health System (Michigan)
  - St. Joseph's Health (Syracuse, New York)

== See also ==
- St. Joseph's Hospital
