= Surrey Memorial Hospital =

- Fraser Health
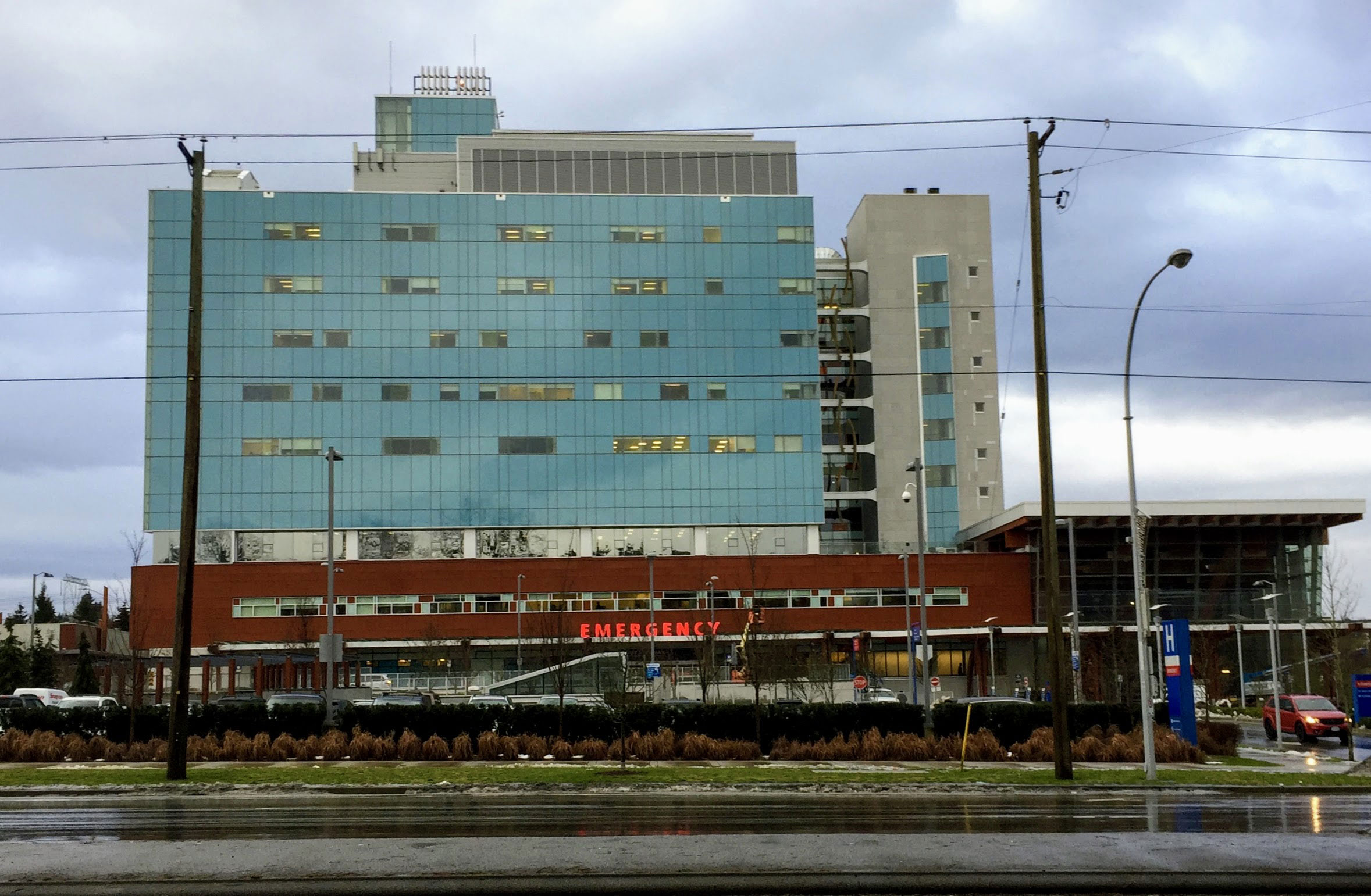

Geography
- Location: 13750 96 Avenue, Surrey, British Columbia, Canada
- Coordinates: 49.1757°N 122.8430°W

Organization
- Care system: Public Medicare (Canada)
- Type: Community, teaching
- Affiliated university: UBC Faculty of Medicine

Services
- Emergency department: Level III trauma centre
- Beds: 650

Helipads
- Helipad: TC LID: CVS3

History
- Founded: 1959

Links
- Website: www.fraserhealth.ca/Service-Directory/Locations/Surrey/surrey-memorial-hospital
- Lists: Hospitals in Canada

Surrey Memorial Hospital (SMH) is a publicly funded acute care hospital located in Surrey, British Columbia, Canada. It is owned and operated by Fraser Health and serves as a major referral hospital for Surrey and surrounding communities in the Fraser Valley.

Opened in 1959, the hospital has expanded significantly in response to rapid population growth in the region. It provides a wide range of inpatient and outpatient services, including emergency care, maternity and pediatric services, critical care, renal and cancer services, mental health care and specialized surgical programs.

Surrey Memorial Hospital is one of the largest hospitals in British Columbia by bed capacity and patient volume. Ongoing redevelopment and expansion projects continue to play a key role in supporting regional health care delivery within the Fraser Health Authority.

== Overview ==
Surrey Memorial Hospital began operations in early 1959 and officially opened on January 31 of that year. It is one of twelve hospitals operated by Fraser Health, the regional health authority responsible for publicly funded health care services across much of Metro Vancouver and the Fraser Valley. Fraser Health provides care to more than 1.8 million residents.

The hospital is among the largest acute care facilities in British Columbia and serves a rapidly growing and diverse population in Surrey and surrounding communities. It operates one of the busiest emergency departments in the province, with more than 158,000 emergency visits annually as of 2019, making it one of the busiest emergency departments in Canada.

Surrey Memorial Hospital provides a broad range of medical and surgical services. These include general acute care, a dedicated pediatric emergency area, regional referral services for pediatrics and maternity care, mental health inpatient units and extended care services. The hospital also offers specialized programs in cancer care, renal care and kidney dialysis, sleep disorders and palliative care.

In partnership with the nearby Jim Pattison Outpatient Care and Surgery Centre, Surrey Memorial Hospital supports advanced surgical and diagnostic services, including breast cancer surgery and breast reconstruction, serving patients from across the Fraser Health region.

== Statistics ==
Surrey Memorial Hospital recorded approximately 161,256 emergency department visits in 2021–22, reflecting the high volume of demand for acute care services.

In the same reporting period, the hospital provided more than 340,000 ambulatory and clinic visits, and recorded 14,967 critical care in-patient days and 10,882 neonatal intensive care in-patient days.

== Expansion ==
Surrey Memorial Hospital has undergone multiple major expansion projects to address increasing demand for acute and specialized health care services in Surrey and the surrounding region.

=== Critical Care Tower (2011–2014) ===
On March 21, 2011, construction began on an eight-storey Critical Care Tower at Surrey Memorial Hospital. The project was designed to significantly expand the hospital’s acute care capacity and modernize clinical facilities. The expansion increased the number of acute care beds by approximately 30 per cent, bringing the hospital’s total capacity to 650 beds.

The project included a new emergency department nearly five times the size of the previous facility, 48 private neonatal rooms, 25 intensive care unit beds, 25 high-acuity unit beds, two additional inpatient medical floors, an expanded laboratory and a rooftop helipad. Space was also added to support the hospital’s clinical academic campus affiliated with the University of British Columbia Faculty of Medicine.

Construction of the new emergency department was completed in late 2013, and the Critical Care Tower officially opened in June 2014.

=== Interventional radiology suite (2021) ===
In December 2021, Surrey Memorial Hospital opened a new interventional radiology suite providing minimally invasive diagnostic and therapeutic procedures. The facility expanded the hospital’s capacity for image-guided interventions, including cancer-related treatments and other complex procedures.

The $4.1 million project was funded through a partnership between the Government of British Columbia, Fraser Health and the Surrey Hospitals Foundation, with additional support from community donors.

=== Interventional cardiology and cardiac catheterization laboratories (2025) ===
In December 2025, Surrey Memorial Hospital is scheduled to open its first cardiac catheterization laboratory, providing interventional cardiology services south of the Fraser River. The facility will support diagnostic and interventional cardiac procedures, including coronary angiography and minimally invasive cardiac interventions.

The new cardiac catheterization laboratory is intended to improve access to specialized cardiac care for patients in Surrey and surrounding communities, reducing the need for transfers to hospitals north of the Fraser River. The project represents a significant expansion of specialized acute care services at Surrey Memorial Hospital.

=== Renal hemodialysis expansion (announced 2024) ===
In June 2024, the provincial government announced an $85-million expansion of renal services at Surrey Memorial Hospital. The new renal facility opened in July 2026, adding 21 hemodialysis treatment stations, increasing the hospital’s total to 60 and expanding dialysis capacity by approximately 55 per cent, while improving access to dialysis for people in Surrey and surrounding communities.

=== New Critical Care Tower (announced 2024) ===
In March 2024, it was announced that Surrey Memorial Hospital would receive a new Critical Care Tower as part of continued provincial investment in acute and specialized care infrastructure. The planned tower is expected to include additional acute care beds and specialized clinical services to support the hospital’s growing patient volumes.

Details regarding the scope and timeline of the project were released by the provincial government, with further planning and construction phases to follow.

== History ==
After World War II, the population of suburban communities like Surrey were growing. The nearest hospital, Royal Columbian Hospital in New Westminster, began limiting access to residents from the growing suburban communities.

In 1948, the White Rock Hospital Society formed to fundraise and advocate for government support for creation of a hospital (Peace Arch Hospital) for White Rock and South Surrey, while residents of North Surrey and Cloverdale advocated for a hospital in the northern part of the district, which ended up being Surrey Memorial Hospital.

Premier W. A. C. Bennett of the British Columbia Social Credit Party required the community to contribute at least one-third of costs for construction. For Surrey Memorial, that equalled $100,000. The women who formed Surrey's first "Ladies Auxiliary" not only rose to the challenge, but personally delivered the funds to the premier in his Victoria office.

Ultimately, the efforts of the community succeeded in the creation of the hospital. The hospital opened on 31 January 1959 in a ceremony officiated by then B.C. health minister Eric Martin. A few thousand people were in attendance, with tours of the new hospital also being given.

In 1992, the Surrey Hospital & Outpatient Centre Foundation was established which has since raised more than $60 million to purchase medical equipment, fund innovative programs, and support training and research.

SMH was eventually merged into the South Fraser Health Region (SFHR) which also administered health care in Delta, Surrey and Langley. In 2001, SMH came under management of Fraser Health when SFHR was merged with its neighbouring health regions to create a new regional health authority.

Under the guidance of Dr. Peter Doris and Dr. Adrian Lee, the breast reconstruction program was launched in 2003. This quickly expanded with the addition of trained breast and reconstructive surgeons Dr. Rhonda Janzen, Dr. Paul Oxley and Dr. Rizwan Mian. In 2011 the Breast Health Clinic was launched at the Jim Pattison Out Patient and Surgery Centre. Now with three general surgeons and five plastic surgeons, this clinic has become one of the leaders of breast cancer care in Canada.
