= Chilliwack General Hospital =

Hospital in British Columbia, Canada

- Fraser Health

Geography
- Location: 45600 Menholm Road, Chilliwack, British Columbia, Canada
- Coordinates: 49°10′0″N 121°57′49″W

Organization
- Care system: Public Medicare (Canada)
- Type: Community

Services
- Emergency department: Yes
- Beds: 169

History
- Opened: February 28, 1912

Links
- Website: www.fraserhealth.ca/Service-Directory/Locations/Chilliwack/chilliwack-general-hospital
- Lists: Hospitals in Canada

Chilliwack General Hospital is a community hospital facility located in Chilliwack, British Columbia, which is operated by the Fraser Health Authority (FHA).

== History ==
Opened on February 28, 1912, the original building was replaced by a new hospital building, opened on June 19, 1940.

In 1993, Chilliwack General Hospital was the first hospital in British Columbia to adopt Patient Focused Care (PFC), a consultant driven approach to providing healthcare services. Both St. Boniface General Hospital and the Winnipeg Health Science Centre had previously adopted the solution in Canada.

A $35 million expansion to the hospital's healthcare facilities was opened in 2011.

Chilliwack General Hospital is an affiliated hospital with the University of British Columbia Faculty of Medicine. Classified as an Affiliated Region Center, the hospital is a training facility for the Family Medicine Residency Program.

== Philanthropy ==
The hospital's capital costs are financially supported by both the Chilliwack Hospital Foundation and the Fraser Valley Health Care Foundation.

== Amenities ==
Chilliwack General Hospital offers numerous healthcare services including:

- 24/7 Emergency services
  - Emergency medicine
- Internal medicine
- Orthopedics
- Urology
- Obstetrics and gynecology
- Ophthalmology
- ENT
- Pediatrics
- Radiology
- Psychiatry
- Pathology
- Anesthesia
- Geriatrics
- Palliative care

== See also ==
- List of hospitals in British Columbia
