= Richard Irvine Bentley =

Canadian physician

Richard Irvine Bentley (1 January 1854 – 1909) was the superintendent to the British Columbia provincial Asylum for the Insane and medical officer to the New Westminster Gaol. He was also surgeon of the Royal Columbian Hospital.
