= Fred Gingell =

Canadian politician

Fred Gingell (November 18, 1930 – July 6, 1999) was an English-born political figure in British Columbia. He represented Delta South in the Legislative Assembly of British Columbia from 1991 to 1999 as a Liberal. He was born in London.

He served as finance critic in the provincial assembly. Gingell was leader of the opposition in the provincial assembly from February 1993 to March 1994. He served as the first president of Kwantlen College. Gingell died in office from cancer.

Fred Gingell Park in Tsawwassen was named in his honour. A provincial program to treat stuttering is named the Fred Gingell Memorial Stuttering Treatment Support Program.

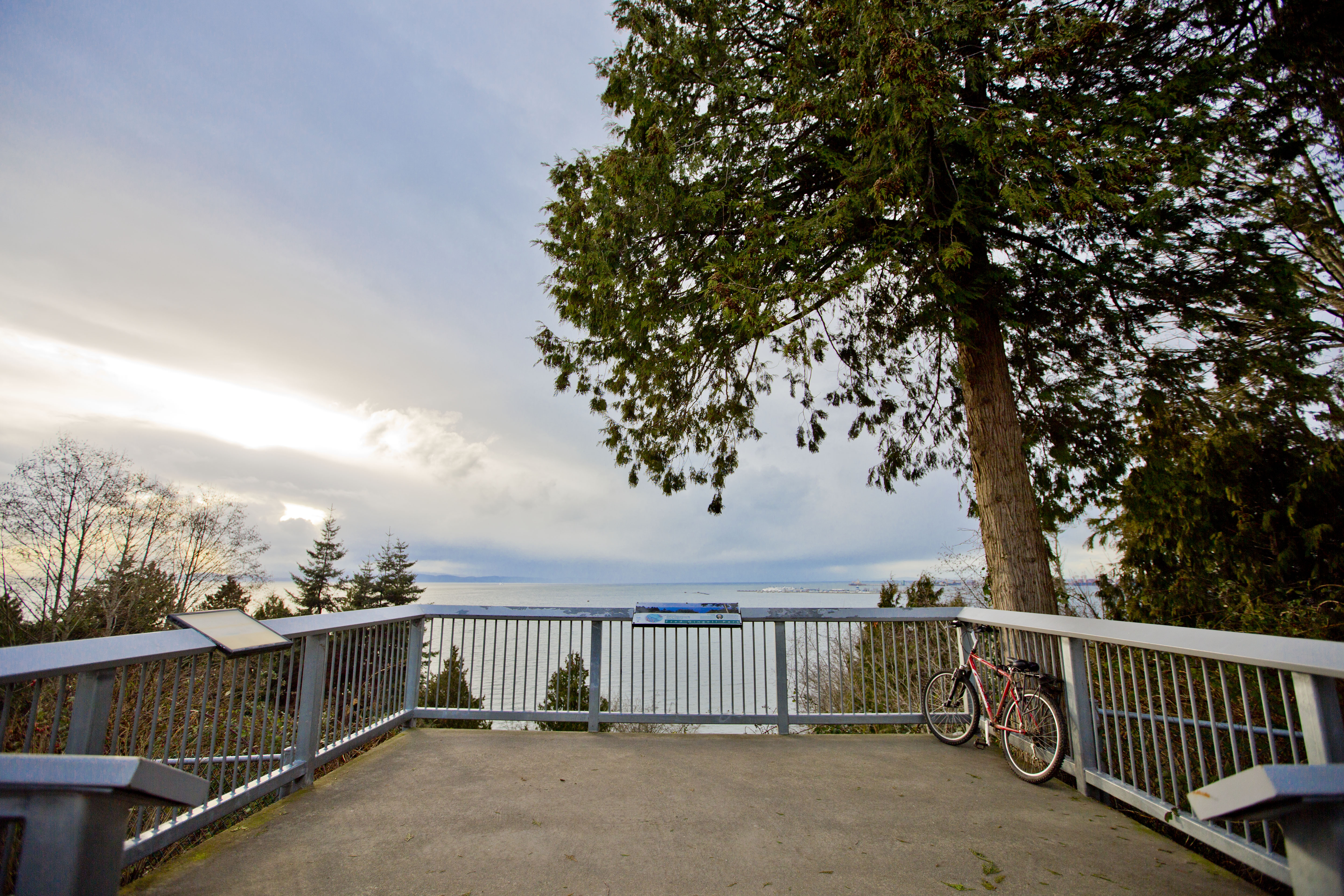
Fred Gingell Park viewpoint
