= Peace Arch Hospital =

Public hospital in White Rock, British Columbia, Canada

- Fraser Health
- Aerial view for Peace Arch Hospital in 2026

Geography
- Location: 15521 Russell Avenue, White Rock, British Columbia, Canada
- Coordinates: 49.029955°N 122.793632°W

Organization
- Care system: Medicare
- Type: General

Services
- Emergency department: Yes
- Beds: 146

History
- Founded: August 25, 1954

Links
- Website: www.fraserhealth.ca/Service-Directory/Locations/White-Rock/peace-arch-hospital

Peace Arch Hospital (PAH) is a 146-bed acute care facility, and Level IV trauma centre owned and operated by Fraser Health. The hospital is located at 15521 Russell Avenue, White Rock, British Columbia, Canada, and its catchment area includes South Surrey.

== History ==
After World War II, Royal Columbian Hospital in New Westminster began limiting access to residents from the growing suburban communities such as the then-District of Surrey which included the future (established in 1957) City of White Rock.

In 1948, the White Rock Hospital Society formed to fundraise and advocate for government support for creation of a local hospital, while residents of North Surrey and Cloverdale advocated for a hospital in the northern part of the district, which ended up being Surrey Memorial Hospital. The society's fundraising goal was $150,000, one-third of the construction costs as required by the provincial government.

Construction began in 1951 on land donated by a nearby resident. The 45-bed White Rock District Hospital opened on August 25, 1954.

The hospital's name was changed to Peace Arch Hospital. It also eventually was merged into the South Fraser Health Region (SFHR) which also administered health care in Delta, Surrey and Langley. In 2001, PAH came under management of Fraser Health when SFHR was merged with its neighbouring health regions to create a new regional health authority.

In 2009, then Minister of Education Margaret MacDiarmid was rushed to PAH for emergency treatment for what was diagnosed as pneumococcal meningitis. MacDiarmid recovered and later was appointed minister of health.

Fraser Health and the Peach Arch Hospital & Community Health Foundation partnered to complete Peace Arch Hospital Master Concept Plan in 2012. It identified four priority projects: a redeveloped and expanded emergency department, new surgical procedure rooms, a new 200-bed residential care building, and the new 15 bed Peace Arch Hospice. In 2013, Health Minister MacDiarmid announced $3 million in government funding to expand the hospice.

In April 2017, the hospital began construction on an expanded emergency department, new operating rooms and renovation of the existing medical reprocessing department as part of a $83.7 million construction project.

== Facilities ==
Peace Arch Hospital offers community services such as:

- 24/7 Emergency Services
- After-hours Emergency Surgery
- After-hours Obstetrics
- Critical care
- Elective Inpatient and Day Surgery
- Laboratory Services
- Low-risk Obstetrical Care
- Outpatient Services
- Ambulatory Care
- Cardiac Rehabilitation
- Early Psychosis Management
- Seniors' Services
- Radiology
- Nuclear Medicine
