= Fraser Canyon Hospital =

Hospital in Hope, British Columbia, Canada

- Fraser Health
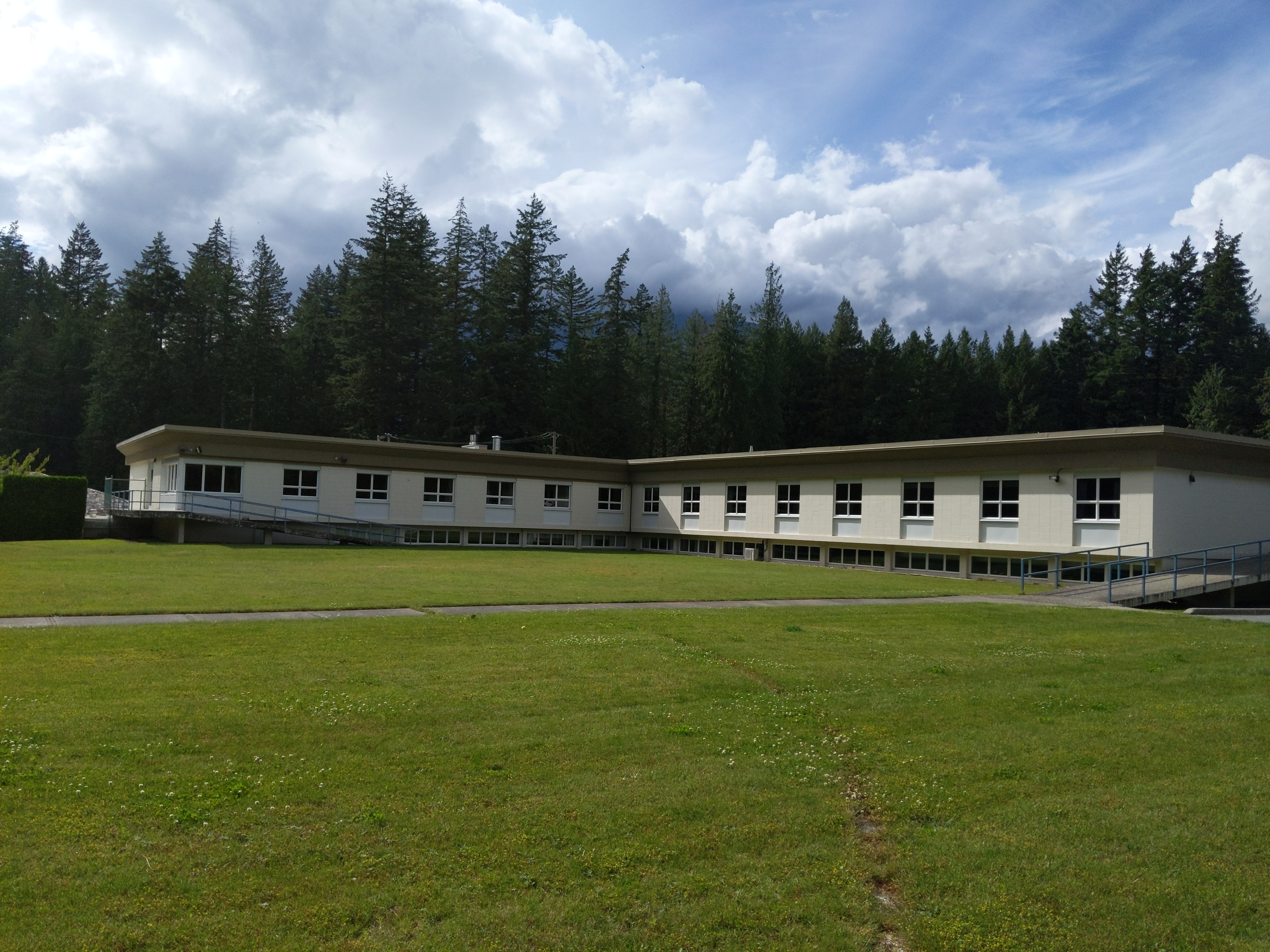
- Fraser Canyon Hospital in 2020

Geography
- Location: Hope, Lower Mainland, British Columbia, Canada
- Coordinates: 49.37742°N 121.42382°W

Organization
- Care system: Public Medicare (Canada) (MSP)

Services
- Emergency department: Yes
- Beds: 10

Links
- Website: www.fraserhealth.ca/Service-Directory/Locations/Hope/fraser-canyon-hospital
- Lists: Hospitals in Canada

Fraser Canyon Hospital (FCH) is a publicly funded community hospital in the town of Hope, British Columbia, Canada. The hospital is both owned and operated by the Fraser Health Authority (FHA).

== Overview ==
FCH is a 10-bed hospital and provides services including: 24/7 emergency care stabilization and triage and hospice beds and services. Emergency care stabilization and triage 24/7 is a critical need for Fraser Canyon Hospital due to its geographic isolation and the number of travellers using the major highways that converge in the area. One such traveller was Grand Chief Stewart Phillip who was triaged at FCH in 2014 after his car flipped over. On April 17, 1999, an 8-year-old girl playing near Kawkawa Lake Camp was treated at FCH after being attacked by young female cougar.

== History ==
The establishment of a hospital was a political issue in the 1950s, escalated by the 1956 Slesse Mountain airplane crash that killed all 62 people on board. Efforts and assets by the local Medical Clinic Association to set up a privately operated facility were transferred to the Hope Hospital Association to build and operate a government-backed hospital. Area MLA Irvine Finlay Corbett of the British Columbia Social Credit Party was an advocate but died in his own air crash prior to the opening of the hospital.

Health Minister Eric Martin officially opened FCH on January 10, 1959. The 20-bed hospital was complete with delivery and operating rooms. In 2001, its governance transferred from the Fraser Valley Health Region to the newly created and larger Fraser Health Authority as part of a province-wide restructuring of health authorities.

== Philanthropy ==
The hospital is supported by the Fraser Valley Healthcare Foundation and by the Auxiliary to the Fraser Canyon Hospital and Fraser Hope Lodge which operates gift shops in both facilities.
