= Richard Bentley (MP) =

English politician

Richard Bentley (died c. 1441) was an English politician. He sat as MP for Shrewsbury in 1420 and 1429.

He also served as assessor of Shrewsbury from September 1415 till 1416, 1422 till 1423, and 1426 till 1427; coroner of Shrewsbury from 1425 till 1426; under sheriff of Shropshire from c. 1419 till 1420; acting sheriff from 13 October till November 1420; commissioner of inquiry in Shrewsbury in November 1434 concerning misuse of murage; and coroner of Shropshire from 14 January 1423 till his death.

Before 1426, he married Agnes and they had at least two daughters.
