= Delta South =

Provincial electoral district in British Columbia, Canada

British Columbia electoral district
- Interactive map of riding boundaries

Provincial electoral district
- Legislature: Legislative Assembly of British Columbia
MLA
Ian Paton
Conservative
- First contested: 1991
- Last contested: 2026

Demographics
- Population (2021): 51,908
- Area (km²): 455
- Pop. density (per km²): 114.1
- Census division: Metro Vancouver
- Census subdivision(s): Delta (part), Musqueam 4, Tsawwassen

Delta South is a provincial electoral district in British Columbia that has been represented in the Legislative Assembly of British Columbia since 1991.

Established under the 1991 electoral redistribution, the district was first contested in the 1991 general election. It was created following the division of the previous two-member district of Delta.

== Demographics ==
Population, 2021	51,908
Area (km^{2})	455
Pop. density (people per km^{2})	114
Source: BC Electoral Boundaries Commission

== Geography ==
Located in Delta, the district comprises the communities of Ladner, Tsawwassen and Boundary Bay. It is bordered by the Fraser River to the north, the Canada–United States border to the south and the Strait of Georgia to the west.

== Members of the Legislative Assembly ==
This riding has elected the following members of the Legislative Assembly:

Assembly	Years	Member	Party
Delta South; Riding created from Delta
35th	1991–1996	Fred Gingell	Liberal
36th	1996–1999	Fred Gingell	Liberal
36th	1999–2001	Val Roddick	Liberal
37th	2001–2005	Val Roddick	Liberal
38th	2005–2009	Val Roddick	Liberal
39th	2009–2013	Vicki Huntington	Independent
40th	2013–2017	Vicki Huntington	Independent
41st	2017–2020	Ian Paton	Liberal
42nd	2020–2023	Ian Paton	Liberal
42nd	2023–2024	Ian Paton	BC United
42nd	2024–2024	Ian Paton	Conservative
43rd	2024–2026	Ian Paton	Conservative
43rd	2026–2026	Ian Paton	Independent
43rd	2026–2026 (Note: Rejoined the Conservatives after dissolution.)	Ian Paton	CentreBC
44th	2026–present	Ian Paton	Conservative

== Election results ==
2026 British Columbia general election
Party	Candidate	Votes	%	±%	Expenditures
Conservative	Ian Paton	14,473	59.78	+4.71	
New Democratic	Jason McCormick	6,918	28.58	-16.35	
Green	Skadi Green	1,988	8.21	-	
OneBC	Jim McMurtry	799	3.30	-	
Total valid votes		24,178	99.87		
Total rejected ballots		31	0.13		
Turnout					
Registered voters					
Conservative hold		Swing		+10.53	
Source: Elections BC

2024 British Columbia general election
Party	Candidate	Votes	%	±%	Expenditures
Conservative	Ian Paton	14,491	55.07	–	$42,172.84
New Democratic	Jason McCormick	11,822	44.93	+10.4	$4,990.71
Total valid votes/expense limit		26,313	99.62	–	$71,700.08
Total rejected ballots		101	0.38	–	
Turnout		26,414	65.04	–	
Registered voters		40,611			
Conservative notional gain from BC United		Swing		N/A (Note: Swing cannot be calculated as BC United did not run a candidate in this riding.)	
Source: Elections BC

2020 provincial election redistributed results
Party	%
Liberal	51.0
New Democratic	34.5
Green	14.5

2020 British Columbia general election
Party	Candidate	Votes	%	±%	Expenditures
Liberal	Ian Paton	12,828	51.70	+7.6	$41,976.94
New Democratic	Bruce Reid	8,404	33.87	+13.15	$4,625.74
Green	Peter van der Velden	3,581	14.43	+5.12	$0.00
Total valid votes		24,813	100.00	–	
Total rejected ballots					
Turnout					
Registered voters					
Source: Elections BC

2017 British Columbia general election
Party	Candidate	Votes	%	±%	Expenditures
Liberal	Ian Paton	11,123	44.10	+7.45	$52,639
Independent	Nicholas Wong	6,437	25.52	–	$14,182
New Democratic	Bruce Reid	5,228	20.72	+5.17	$4,570
Green	Larry Colero	2,349	9.31	–	$389
Action	Errol Edmund Sherley	88	0.35	–	$0
Total valid votes		25,225	100.00	–	
Total rejected ballots		68	0.27	−0.14	
Turnout		25,293	71.79	+3.50	
Registered voters		35,234			
Source: Elections BC

2013 British Columbia general election
Party	Candidate	Votes	%	±%	Expenditures
Independent	Vicki Huntington	11,376	47.80	+5.17	$79,284
Liberal	Bruce McDonald	8,721	36.65	−5.85	$107,153
New Democratic	Nic Slater	3,700	15.55	+3.17	$35,818
Total valid votes		23,797	100.00		
Total rejected ballots		97	0.41		
Turnout		23,894	68.29		
Source: Elections BC

B.C. General Election 2009: Delta South
Party	Candidate	Votes	%	±	Expenditures
Independent	Vicki Huntington	9,977	42.63%		$61,113
Liberal	Wally Oppal	9,945	42.50%		$201,544
New Democratic	Dileep Athaide	2,940	12.38%		$30,486
Green	Duane Laird	555	2.24%	–	$362
Independent	John Shavluk	60	0.26%		$250
Total Valid Votes		23,477	100%		
Total Rejected Ballots		69	0.29%		
Turnout		23,546	68.59%		

B.C. General Election 2005: Delta South
Party	Candidate	Votes	%	±	Expenditures
Liberal	Val Roddick	9,112	37.48%		?
Independent	Vicki Huntington	8,043	33.08%		$23,746
NDP	Dileep Joseph Anthony Athaide	5,828	23.97%		$19,996
Green	Duane Laird	1,131	4.65%	–	$1,500
Marijuana	Julian Bellamy Wooldridge	139	0.57%		$100
Independent	George Mann	58	0.24%		$9,901
Total Valid Votes		24,311	100%		
Total Rejected Ballots		88	0.36%		
Turnout		24,399	70.81%		

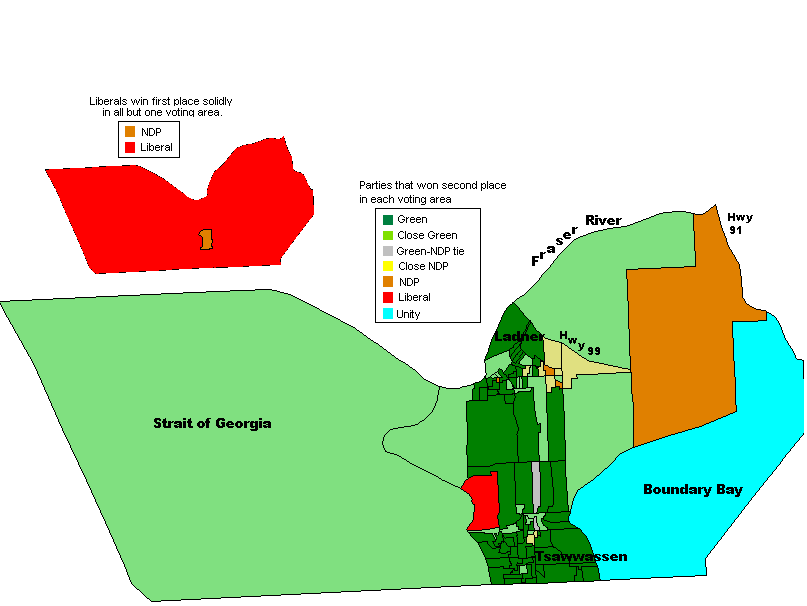
Popular vote by voting area

B.C. General Election 2001: Delta South
Party	Candidate	Votes	%	±	Expenditures
Liberal	Val Roddick	14,596	67.00%		$31,454
Green	Rob La Belle	3,650	16.75%	–	$2,481
NDP	Ruth Mary Adams	2,053	9.42%		$5,268
Unity	Justin P. Goodrich	760	3.49%		$500
Marijuana	Mike Hansen	507	2.33%		$721
Independent	George Mann	114	0.52%		$2,265
Independent	Paul Dhillon	105	0.49%		
Total Valid Votes		21,785	100.00%		
Total Rejected Ballots		64	0.29%		
Turnout		21,849	73.15%		

Delta South By-election, December 7, 1999
Party	Candidate	Votes	%	±	Expenditures
Liberal	Val Roddick	10,577	59.63%		$50,518
Reform	Bill Vander Zalm	5,837	32.91%		$56,367
Green	Rob La Belle	488	2.75%	–	$1,481
NDP	Richard Tones	433	2.44%		$14,504
Independent	Allan Warnke	153	0.86%		$2,398
Social Credit	Greg Hodgins	137	0.77%		$12,273
Family Coalition	Jim Hessels	112	0.64%	–	$2,842
Total Valid Votes		17,737	100.00%		
Total Rejected Ballots		41	0.23%		
Turnout		17,778	59.78%		

B.C. General Election 1996: Delta South
Party	Candidate	Votes	%	±	Expenditures
Liberal	Fred Gingell	13,415	58.78%		$33,311
NDP	Lloyd MacDonald	5,984	26.22%		$5,553
Reform	Kevin Garvey	1,371	6.01%		$5,249
Progressive Democrat	Donna M. Tobias	1,215	5.32%	–	$288
Green	Greg Dickey	333	1.46%	–	$100
Family Coalition	Jim Hessels	304	1.33%	–	$4,777
Social Credit	Fabian Milat	200	0.88%	–	$3,678
Total Valid Votes		22,822	100.00%		
Total Rejected Ballots		76	0.33%		
Turnout		22,898	74.55%		

B.C. General Election 1991: Delta South
Party	Candidate	Votes	%	±	Expenditures
Liberal	Fred Gingell	8,783	39.82%		$4,146
Social Credit	John L. Savage	6,713	30.44%	–	$48,116
NDP	Brent Kennedy	6,559	29.74%		$33,043
Total Valid Votes		22,055	100.00%		
Total Rejected Ballots		286	0.33%		
Turnout		22,341	80.85%		

== See also ==
- List of British Columbia provincial electoral districts
- Canadian provincial electoral districts
