= Burnaby Hospital =

Public hospital in Burnaby, British Columbia, Canada

- Fraser Health
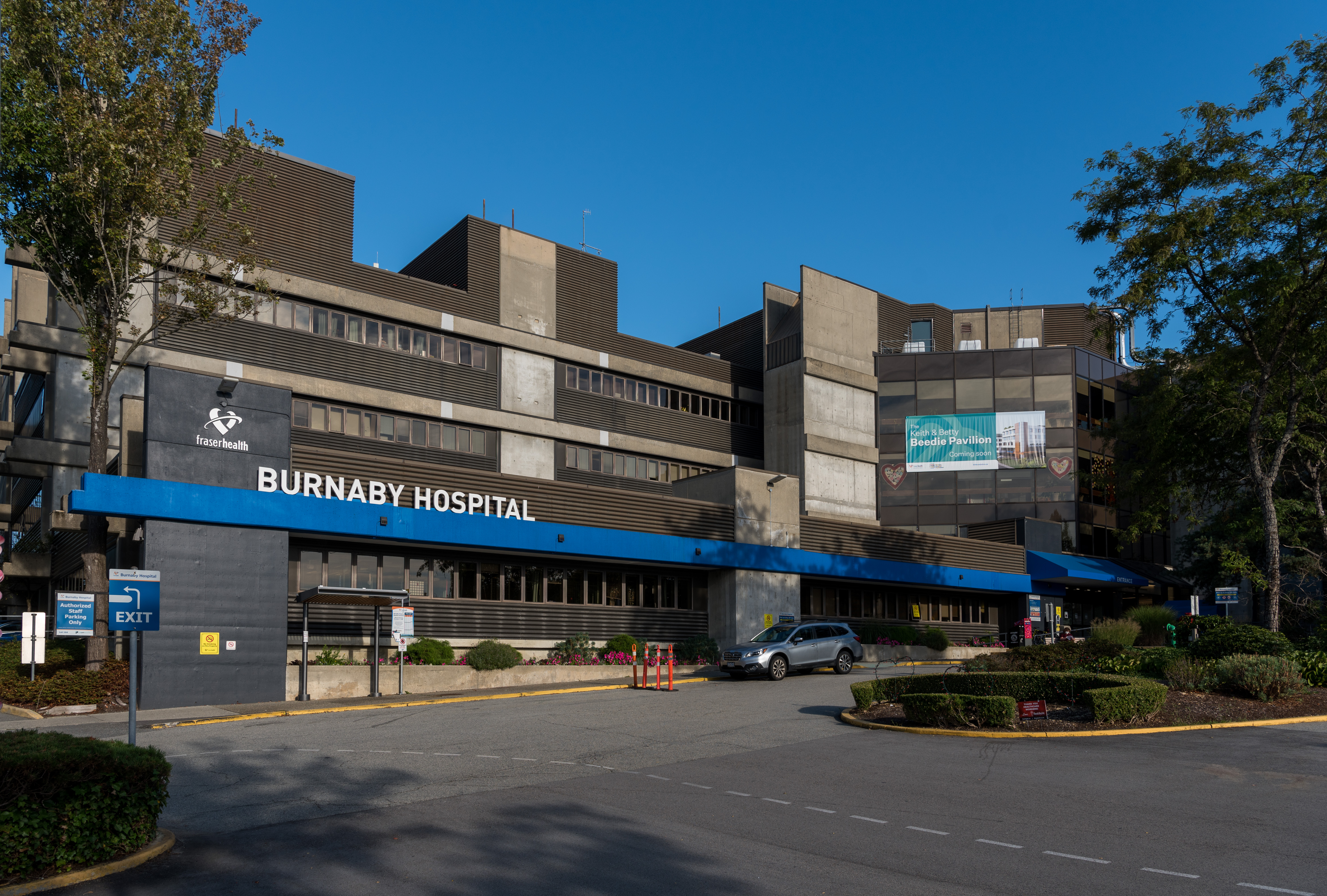
- Main entrance

Geography
- Location: 3935 Kincaid St, Burnaby, British Columbia, Canada
- Coordinates: 49°14′59″N 123°00′57″W

Organization
- Care system: Medicare MSP
- Type: Community

Services
- Emergency department: Yes
- Beds: 297

History
- Founded: 1952

Links
- Website: www.fraserhealth.ca/Service-Directory/Locations/Burnaby/burnaby-hospital
- Lists: Hospitals in Canada

Burnaby Hospital, (formerly known as Burnaby General Hospital) is a healthcare facility located in Burnaby, British Columbia, and operated by the Fraser Health Authority (FHA). One of the largest hospitals outside the City of Vancouver, it serves the communities of Burnaby and East Vancouver. A 297-bed primary and secondary care centre, patient care services include general surgery, orthopedic surgery, medicine, perinatal, neonatal ICU, critical care and emergency services.

== Overview ==
Burnaby Hospital is a university-affiliated hospital with the University of British Columbia, and serves as a training facility for the Family Practice Residency Program, the Pharmacy Practice Residency Program, and the Department of Orthopaedics at UBC.

The Burnaby Hospital Foundation is the philanthropic arm of Burnaby Hospital. The foundation was established in 1982 to raise financial resources needed for life saving diagnostic, surgical, and medical equipment, innovative tools for patient care, and other community healthcare needs. It uses a donor-centred approach, along with its annual fundraising events, the Rhythm of Life Run and Walk and the Slice, to achieve its objectives.

== History ==
In the 1940s, the citizens of Burnaby had a vision of a community hospital to serve the needs of its growing population. An Auxiliary was formed March 17, 1943, inspired by the dedication of Nurse Essex. They named it the "Nurse Essex Auxiliary". Later, in the early '40s, the South Burnaby Auxiliary was formed and these two Auxiliaries, plus twenty five other organizations joined together to build a community hospital in Burnaby.

At the opening of the 125-bed hospital on October 30, 1952, the need for funding grew, and in 1964, a main floor gift shop was opened. In 1968 the two auxiliaries combined into one 222-member organization known as the Ladies Auxiliary to Burnaby Hospital. In 1973, the 147-bed extended care wing was opened and in 1977 the acute care tower. The Atchison wing was officially opened with a potential of 497 acute care beds. Fund raising efforts were expanded as the Thrift shop was opened in 1975. In 1980, the Auxiliary to Burnaby Hospital became incorporated under the Society Act of B.C. and was officially named the Auxiliary to Burnaby Hospital, paving the way for future male membership. The auxiliary also provides approximately 20,000 hours of volunteer service every year.

Burnaby Hospital has since grown into a 314-bed hospital that now services the health care needs of two distinct populations located within the Greater Vancouver Regional District. Burnaby with an estimated population of 247,337 and its neighbour, East Vancouver, with a population of 220,490.

In September 2019, the Government of British Columbia alongside Fraser Health announced that the hospital will undergo a $1.3 billion redevelopment set to be complete in two phases between 2023 and 2027.

On November 15, 2020, a fire in the Cascade building impacted operations and several areas of the campus. The emergency room was closed for about 24 hours and some patients were transferred to other facilities.

== Facilities ==
Burnaby Hospital offers a full range of facilities including a 24-hour emergency department, neurology, oncology, critical care (ICU, Cardiology, ER), obstetrics, pediatrics, surgery, tertiary palliative care, mental health and addictions and maternity services. The Emergency Department sees approximately 85,000 patients annually. It includes specialized units such as the Multiple Sclerosis and Chronic Pain Clinics, and the speech and language pathology programme. The hospital also offers health and nutritional counselling, as well as physiotherapy and mental health programs.

Distribution services include a computerized system to provide centralized, traditional drug distribution to the acute care and long term care areas; total parenteral nutrition, chemotherapy and a full CIVA service.
