= Langley Memorial Hospital =

Coordinates: 49.09538°N 122.61254°W

- Fraser Health
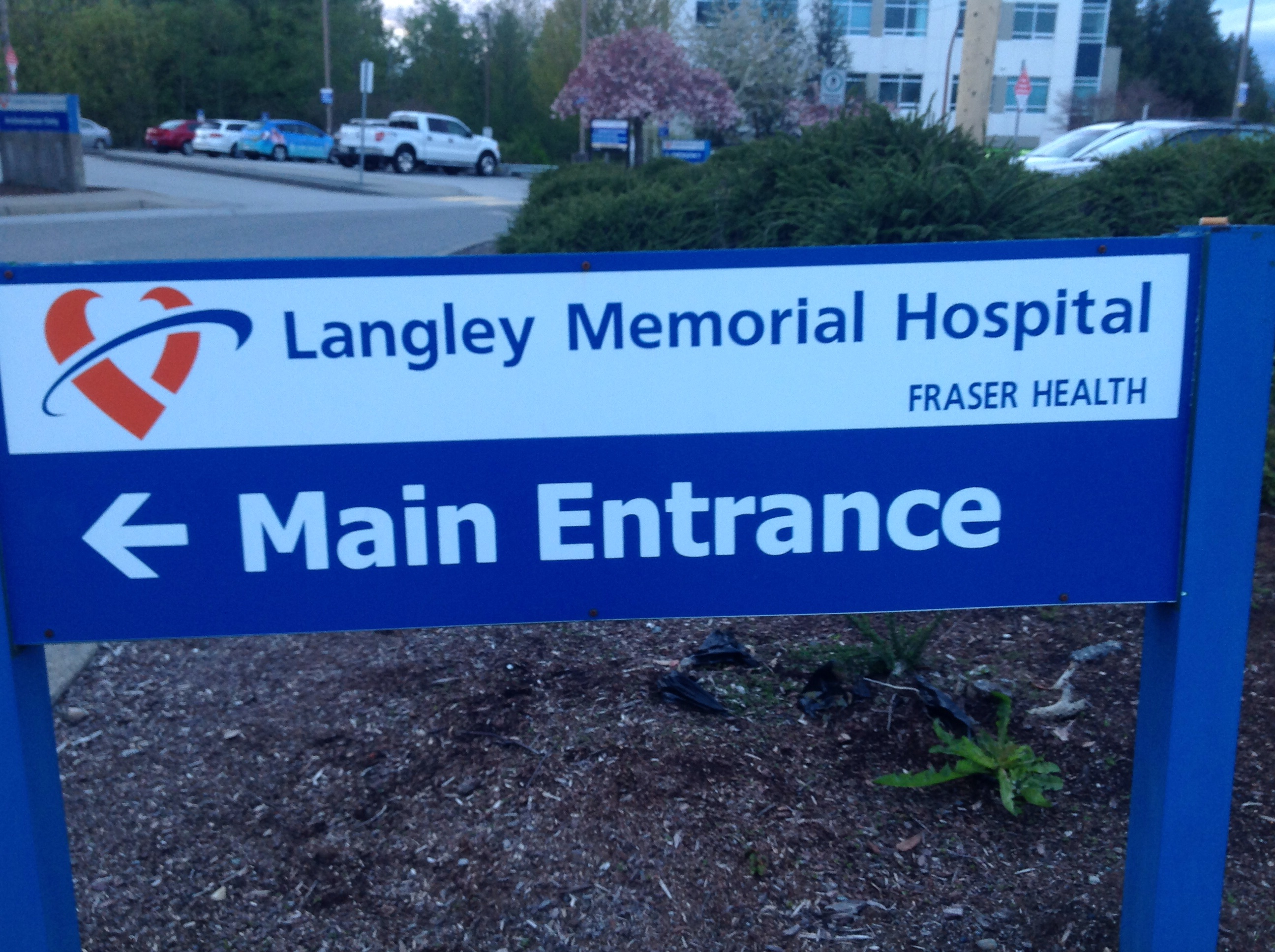

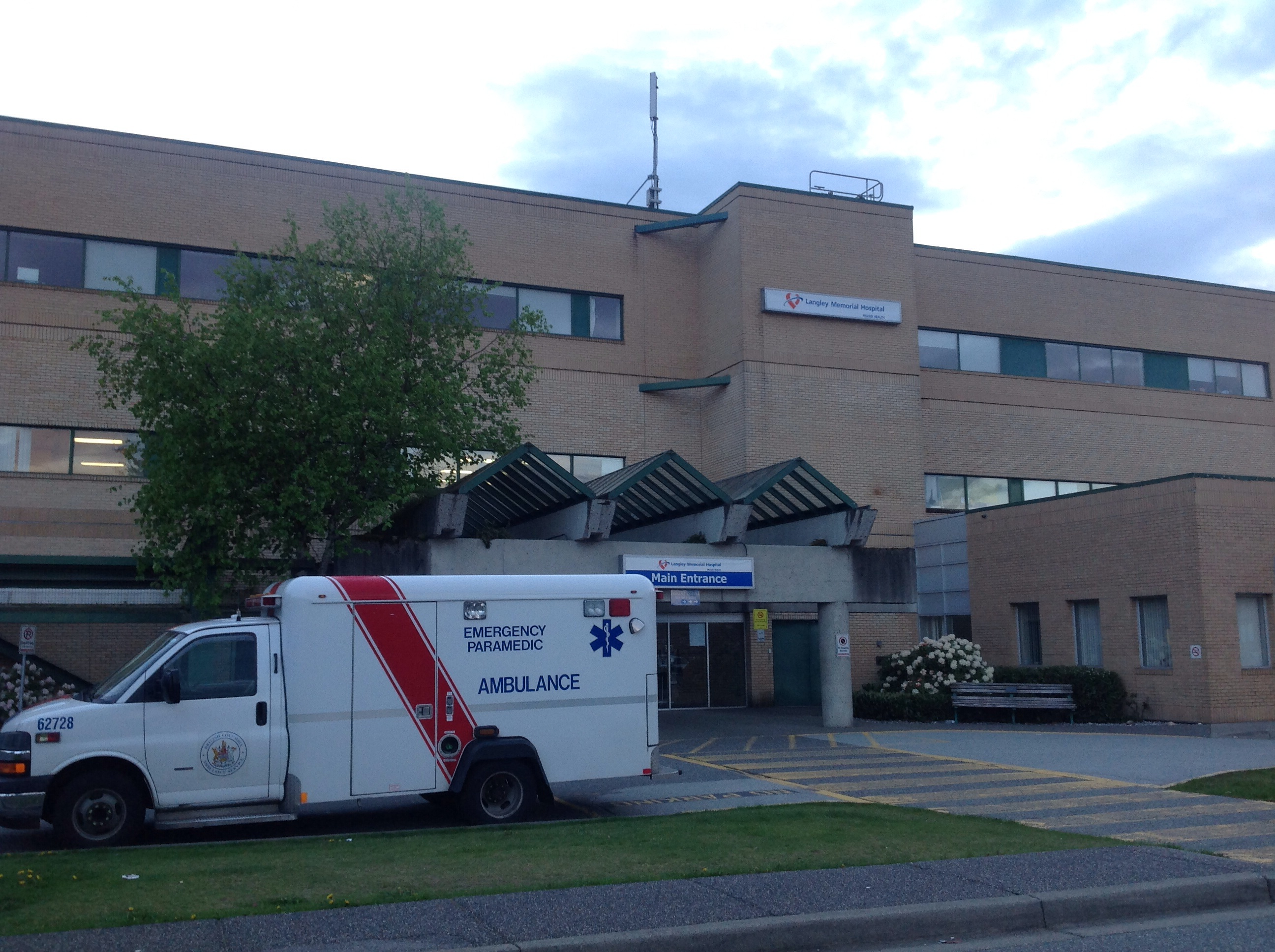
- Main entrance

Geography
- Location: 22051 Fraser Hwy, Township of Langley, British Columbia, Canada

Organization
- Care system: Public Medicare (Canada) (MSP)
- Type: Community

Services
- Emergency department: Yes
- Beds: 188

Links
- Website: www.fraserhealth.ca/Service-Directory/Locations/Langley/langley-memorial-hospital
- Lists: Hospitals in Canada

Langley Memorial Hospital is a government-funded 188-bed acute care facility, and Level IV trauma centre in Township of Langley, British Columbia that is owned and operated by Fraser Health.

== Philanthropic affiliation ==
The hospital is philanthropically affiliated with both the Langley Memorial Hospital Foundation and the Langley Memorial Hospital Auxiliary.

== Healthcare services ==
Physicians and medical professionals at Langley Memorial Hospital provide the following healthcare services to the community.

- 24/7 Emergency services
- Critical care services
- General medical services
- Maternity
- Pediatrics
- Psychiatry
- Mammography
- General surgery
- Day Care Surgery
- Surgical outpatient care
- Radiology
- Geriatric care
