= Fraser Health =

Healthcare region in British Columbia, Canada

Fraser Health Authority
- Formation: 2001
- Merger of: Fraser Valley Health; Simon Fraser Health; South Fraser Health
- Type: Governmental
- Interim Board Chair: Opreet Kang
- President & CEO: Dermot Kelly
- Provincial Health Officer: Bonnie Henry; OBC FRCPC
- Minister: Josie Osborne; MLA
- Budget: $4.7 billion CAD; 2022-2023
- Staff: approx. 45,000 staff and volunteers
- Website: fraserhealth.ca

The Fraser Health Authority (FHA) is one of five regional public health authorities in British Columbia. It is governed by the provincial Health Authorities Act. Between Aug. 1, 2017, and July 31, 2018, Fraser Health performed over 91,000 surgeries and postponed nearly 2,300 operations on the day of surgery.

== History ==
Fraser Health was created in December 2001 as part of a province-wide restructuring of health authorities by the then-new BC Liberal government of Premier Gordon Campbell. It is the merger of three former health regions: Simon Fraser Health Region (SFHR), South Fraser Health Region, and the Fraser Valley Health Region (FVHR).

SFHR had been formed in 1996 by the merger of the Fraser–Burrard Hospital Society (Royal Columbian Hospital, Eagle Ridge Hospital and Ridge Meadows Hospital) with the Burnaby Health Region (Burnaby Hospital) and the extended care facilities operated by the Pacific Health Care Society (Queen's Park Care Centre and Fellburn Care Centre).

== Demographics ==
It has 29,000 employees and serves the region from Boston Bar in the Fraser Canyon down the Fraser River Valley to the Vancouver suburbs of Burnaby and Delta. It is the largest health authority by population in British Columbia (BC). Its 1.9 million residents include approximately 62,000 Indigenous people associated with 32 First Nation bands and 5 Métis chartered communities.

Fraser Health provides health care services for the following communities:

Fraser North	Fraser South	Fraser East
Anmore	Delta*	Abbotsford*
Belcarra	Langley*	Agassiz
Burnaby*	Surrey*	Chilliwack*
Coquitlam	White Rock*	Harrison Hot Springs
New Westminster*		Hope*
Maple Ridge*		Kent
Pitt Meadows		Mission*
Port Coquitlam		Boston Bar
Port Moody*		
*indicates location of hospital

== Facilities and services ==
Services provided by Fraser Health include primary health care, community home care, mental health and addictions, acute medical, and surgical services.

Fraser Health has 13 acute-care hospitals including 3 regional hospitals and 9 community hospitals as well as an outpatient care and surgery centre.

=== Regional hospitals ===
- Abbotsford Regional Hospital and Cancer Centre
- Royal Columbian Hospital
- Surrey Memorial Hospital

=== Community hospitals ===
- Burnaby Hospital
- Chilliwack General Hospital
- Delta Hospital
- Eagle Ridge Hospital
- Fraser Canyon Hospital
- Langley Memorial Hospital
- Mission Memorial Hospital
- Peace Arch Hospital
- Ridge Meadows Hospital

=== Outpatient care and surgery centre ===
- Jim Pattison Outpatient Care and Surgery Centre

According to the Chilliwack Progress in 2019, home-support clients within Fraser Health would have their care directly managed by the health authority.
