= Abbotsford Regional Hospital and Cancer Centre =

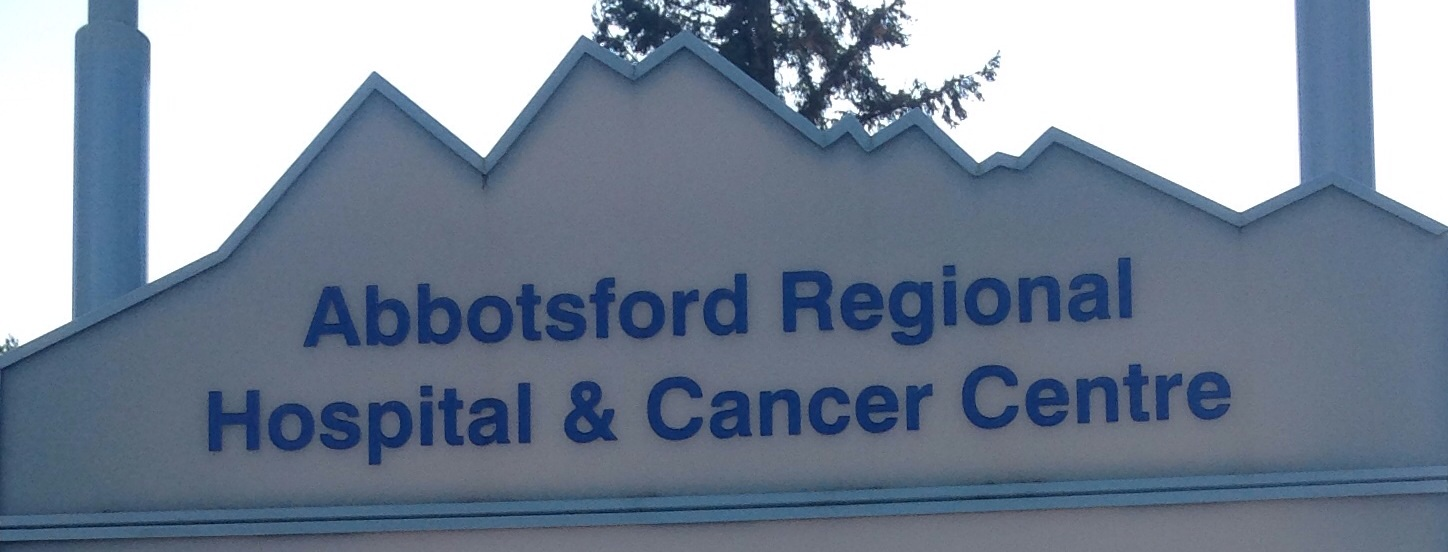

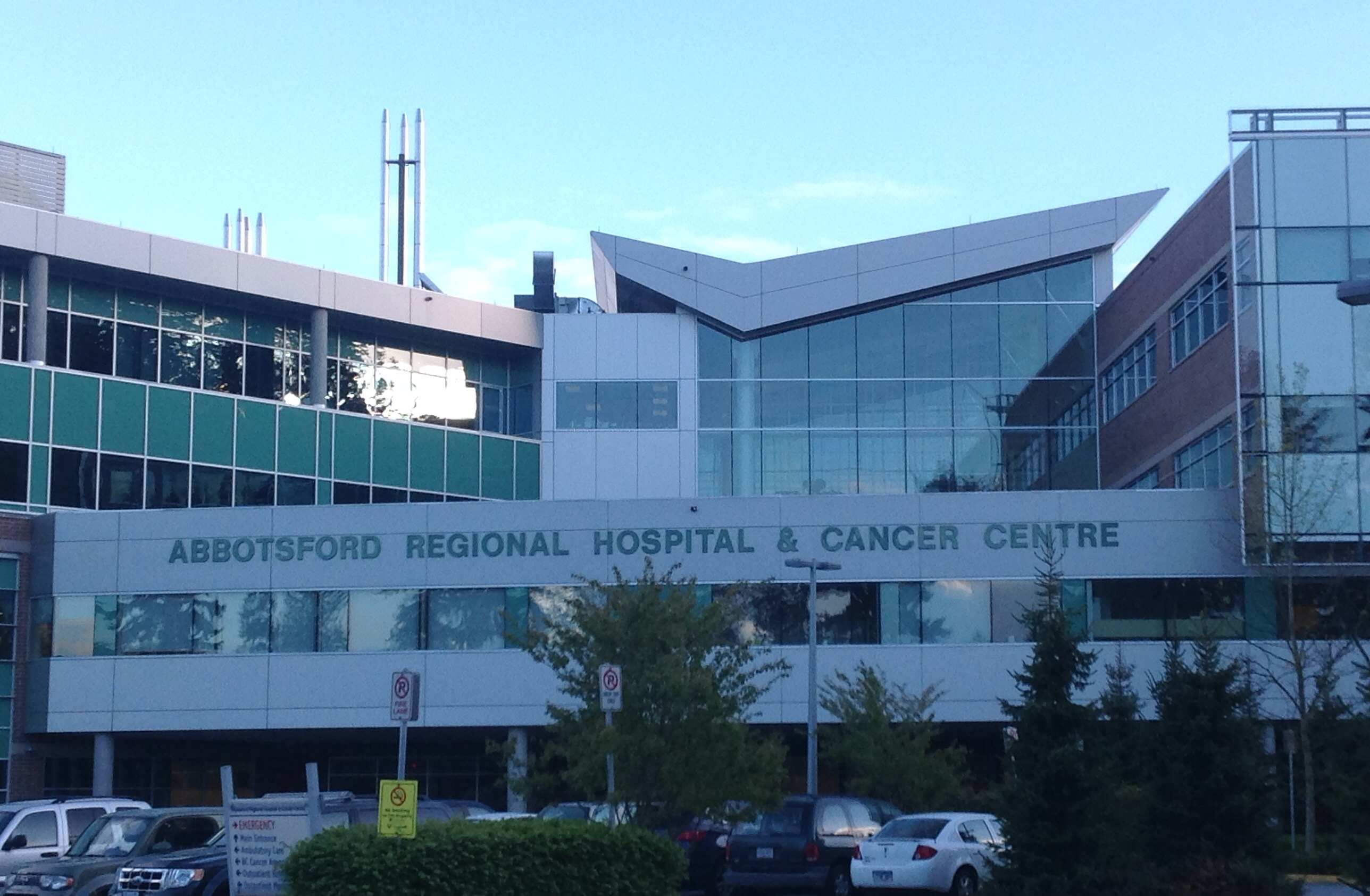

- Location in British Columbia

Geography
- Location: Abbotsford, Fraser Valley, British Columbia, Canada
- Coordinates: 49.038332°N 122.315526°W

Organization
- Care system: Public Medicare (Canada) (MSP)
- Type: Regional hospital
- Network: Hospital: Fraser Health; Cancer Centre: BC Cancer Agency

Services
- Emergency department: Level II trauma centre
- Beds: 300

Helipads
- Helipad: TC LID: CAB5

History
- Founded: August 24, 2008

Links
- Website: www.fraserhealth.ca/Service-Directory/Locations/Abbotsford/abbotsford-regional-hospital-and-cancer-centre
- Lists: Hospitals in Canada

Abbotsford Regional Hospital and Cancer Centre (ARHCC) is a 300-bed Canadian health care facility in the City of Abbotsford, British Columbia that houses the acute care Abbotsford Regional Hospital (ARH) operated by Fraser Health and the regional cancer facility (Abbotsford Centre) operated by the BC Cancer Agency.

ARHCC opened in 2008 as:

- the first new hospital built in the province in 30 years,
- the first hospital in Western Canada to have a cancer centre integrated in its design from the ground up,
- Canada's first newly constructed hospital to meet LEED Gold environmentally friendly standards,
- the largest construction project to date in the Fraser Valley,
- the first in the province to be built using a (P3) public-private partnership model.

It is also the city's largest worksite in terms of number of employees.

== Health services ==
The facility offers both inpatient and outpatient services to residents of Abbotsford and regional services to other communities in the eastern Fraser Valley (Mission, Chilliwack, Hope, etc.)

=== Hospital services ===
Fraser Health's Abbotsford Regional Hospital provides community hospital services to Abbotsford residents and regional services to about 330,000 residents of the eastern Fraser Valley. These services include:

- 24/7 Emergency Medicine
- Intensive Care (ICU)
- Surgery
- General medicine
- Mental Health and Substance Use
- Medical imaging, including MRI, CT scanning
- Cardiac services
- Maternity care, including a neonatal intensive care unit
- Pediatric care
- Dialysis
- Outpatient rehabilitation

=== Cancer control services ===
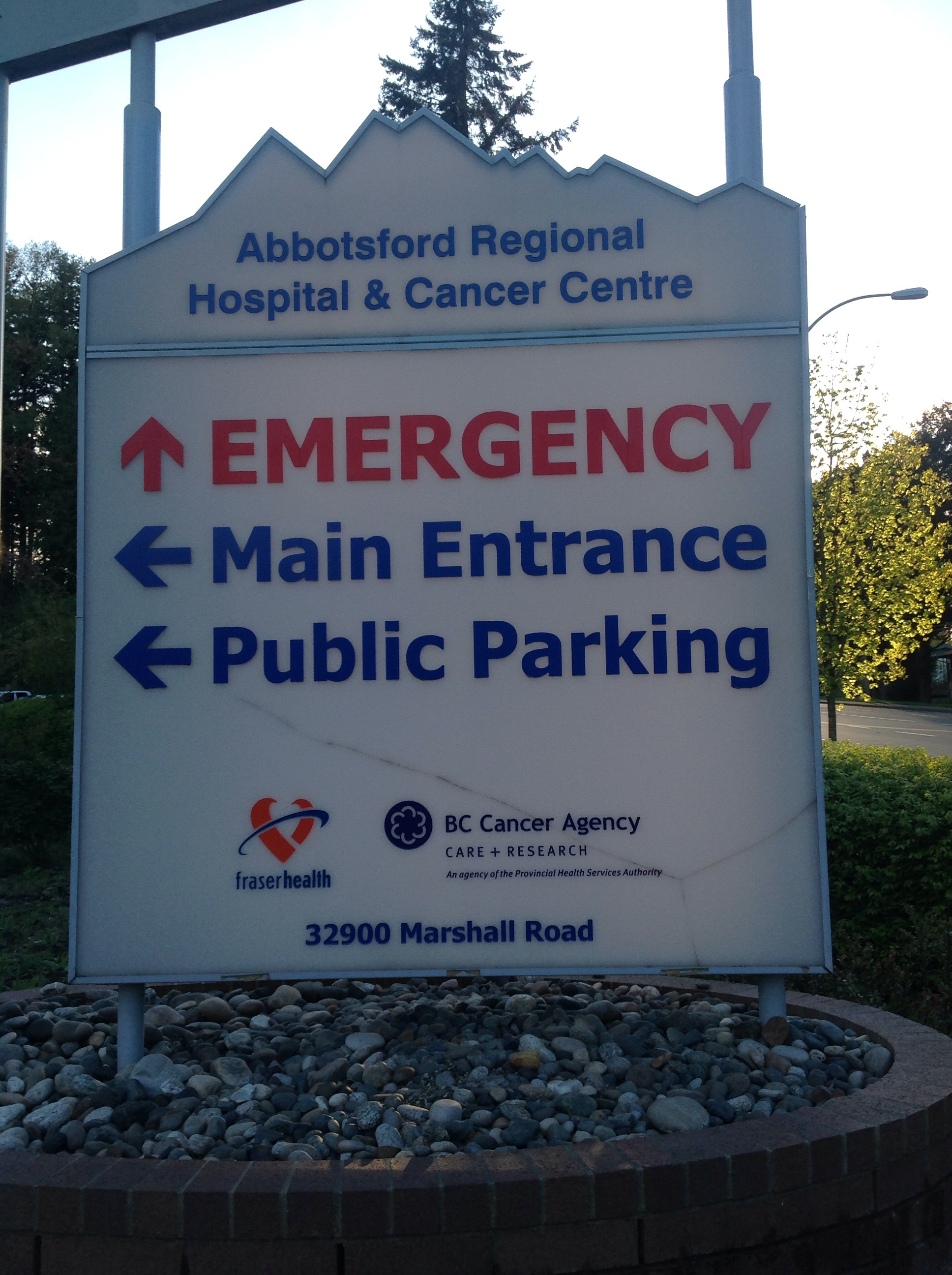

The cancer centre portion of the building is independently operated by the BC Cancer Agency as the Abbotsford Centre, the fifth regional centre in the province, which was created to reduce waits and travel for residents of the eastern Fraser Valley who otherwise would have to travel to centres in Surrey or Vancouver for treatment.

The Abbotsford Centre offers a full range of cancer control services, including:

- New patient multi-disciplinary consultation and care planning
- Systemic Therapy - chemotherapy and immunotherapy
- Radiation Therapy - External beam and brachytherapy
- Supportive care and pain/symptom management
- Nutritional consultation and Patient and Family Counselling Services
- Patient and community education in cancer prevention
- Access to national and international clinical research trials
- Professional education/liaison for community-based cancer control programs

=== Philanthropic affiliations ===
- Fraser Valley Health Care Foundation
- BC Cancer Foundation
- ARH Auxiliary (volunteer services)

== History ==
The current hospital has had two forerunners, with the first being opened on 18 April 1922. This hospital, called the 'Cottage' Hospital opened with a mere 14 beds. Eventually, as Abbotsford and its environs began to grow, a new hospital was needed, and so the Abbotsford-Matsqui-Sumas Hospital opened on 28 February 1953. Despite renovations and upgrades, advocacy for the creation of the now current hospital began two decades prior to its 2008 opening.

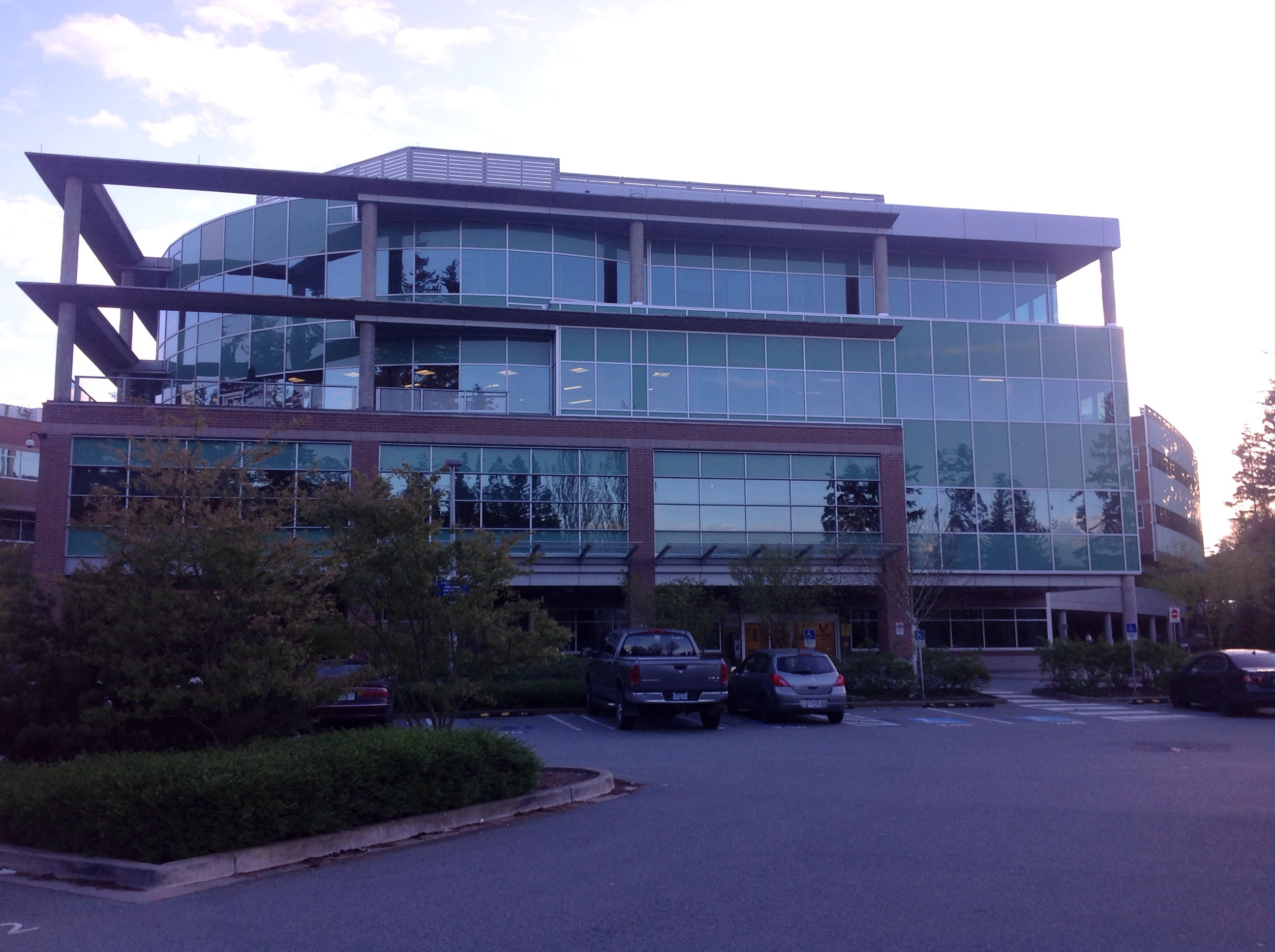
East entrance to Ambulatory Care at ARHCC

=== Replacement of MSA Hospital ===
The current ARHCC was a state-of-the-art replacement for the obsolete MSA (Matsqui-Sumas-Abbotsford) General Hospital which was built in 1953 and was criticized as undersized by the time of its last major renovation in 1980. The community served by MSA grew substantially in recent decades and the three districts amalgamated to form the City of Abbotsford after a plebiscite in 1995.

By the turn of the century, replacement of MSA Hospital was a political issue for the growing Fraser Valley community. After Gordon Campbell was elected as Premier of British Columbia in 2001, his local cabinet ministers Michael de Jong, John van Dongen and Mission MLA Randy Hawes advocated for construction of a new, larger hospital and addition of a regional cancer centre using a public-private partnership (P3) model.

=== Public-private partnership (P3) ===
Design, construction and facility maintenance services are provided by private partner Access Health Abbotsford, a consortium of companies including Sodexo, under a 30-year contract. The design reduced energy costs and environmental features that earned the hospital designation as Leadership in Energy and Environmental Design (LEED) Gold by the Canada Green Building Council. ARHCC was the first P3 infrastructure project for the province's newly created agency Partnerships BC. As a new model for BC public infrastructure, the P3 approach attracted criticism from groups such as Canadian Centre for Policy Alternatives. In the end, ARHCC was built on time and on budget ($355 million for construction and equipment) and the Auditor General of British Columbia assured the P3 approach would benefit government by $39 million over 30 years.

Fraser Valley taxpayers contributed $71.3 million to construction and equipment costs through the Fraser Valley Regional Hospital District.

=== Opening ===
MSA Hospital was closed and inpatients transported to ARHCC on opening day, August 24, 2008. At 60,000 square metres, the 300-bed ARHCC is almost three times the physical size of the 188-bed MSA facility.

The opening ceremony occurred in September 2008. Dignitaries included Premier of British Columbia Gordon Campbell, Health Minister George Abbott and Abbotsford Mayor George Ferguson.

Patient volumes increased after opening in part due to residents of nearby communities checking out the modern facility and continued population growth in the region. At times, hospital congestion result in complaints about patients being cared for in stretchers in hallways. Property adjacent to ARHCC was used by non-profit societies to build three facilities titled the Dave Lede Campus of Care:

- Canuck Place Children's Hospice, programs and services – including end-of-life care – for children 19 years old and under with progressive, life-threatening illnesses
- Dave Holmberg House, an adult hospice operated by the Abbotsford Hospice Society
- Matthew's House, a respite facility for children with severe disabilities
