= Royal Columbian Hospital =

- Fraser Health
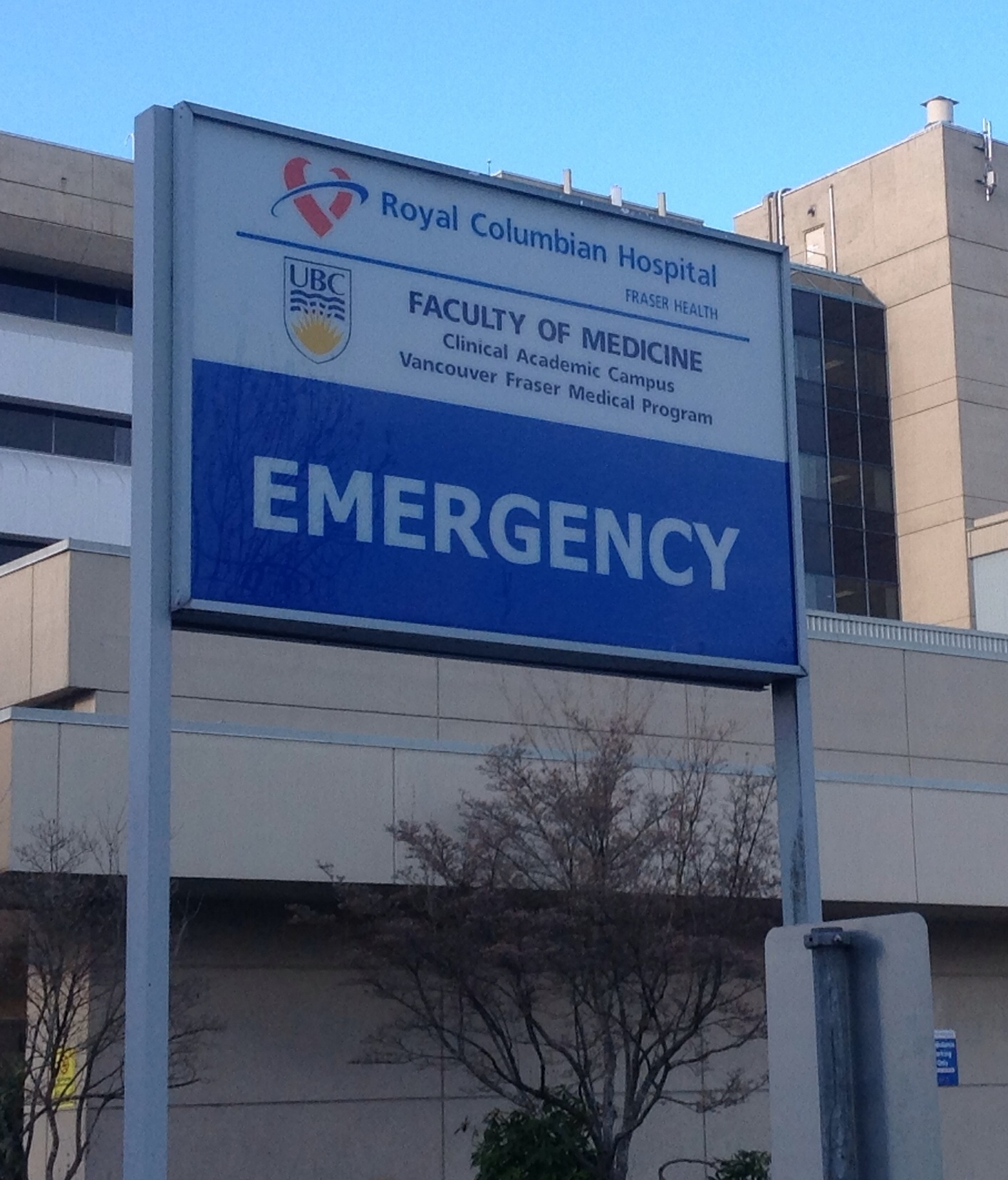

- Royal Columbian Hospital in Sapperton location, circa 1903

Geography
- Location: 330 East Columbia Street, New Westminster, British Columbia, Canada
- Coordinates: 49.226667°N 122.891944°W

Organization
- Care system: Public Medicare (Canada)
- Type: Tertiary
- Affiliated university: UBC Faculty of Medicine

Services
- Emergency department: Level I trauma centre
- Beds: 675

Helipads
- Helipad: TC LID: CNW9

History
- Founded: 1862

Links
- Website: www.fraserhealth.ca/Service-Directory/Locations/New-Westminster/royal-columbian-hospital
- Lists: Hospitals in Canada

Royal Columbian Hospital (RCH) is among the oldest hospitals in British Columbia and one of the busiest in the Fraser Health Authority. It is located in New Westminster overlooking the Fraser River and is the only hospital in the Lower Mainland that is immediately adjacent to a Skytrain station (Sapperton).

In 2020, inpatient bed capacity increased to 490 with the opening of the Mental Health Substance Use Wellness Centre (MHSUWC). In 2017, inpatient bed capacity was reported as 447 and the hospital was served by 3,326 employees.

The hospital campus is L-shaped fronting five streets: East Columbia Street, Sherbrooke Street, Allen Street, Keary Street, and Brunette Avenue. The total square footage of the site is 607,859.

== Overview ==
Royal Columbian Hospital is a major regional critical care site providing a range of primary, secondary and tertiary services. Service is provided via a 24/7 emergency room, along with ambulatory care, outpatient, and extensive inpatient facilities.

Royal Columbian Hospital provides specialized acute care services, such as tertiary trauma, orthopedic surgery, cardiac surgery, neurosurgery, plastic surgery, interventional cardiology and thoracic surgery. The facility also has one of province's four Level 3 Neonatal Intensive Care Units (NICU), capable of serving neonates born as early as 23 weeks into pregnancy.

The hospital has extensive outpatient and inpatient mental health and substances services, centred in the newly redeveloped Mental Health and Substance Use Wellness Centre. In addition, the site is serviced by multiple medical specialties such as internal medicine, cardiology, gastroenterology, nephrology, orthopedics, otolaryngology, gynecology, urology and ophthalmology. It hosts a maternal, infant, child/youth program with levels one to three obstetrical care (high risk obstetrics), levels one and two nursery and paediatric inpatient service.

RCH is no longer part of the BC Cancer Community Oncology Network as of 2021; previously they were a Level 3 full service. RCH provides limited cancer care at this time.

Royal Columbian has a helipad that receives air ambulances operated by the BC Ambulance Service.

== Services, departments and clinical staffing ==
=== Cardiology and cardiac surgery ===
Royal Columbian Hospital performs 95 per cent of the primary angioplasties or percutaneous coronary interventions (PCI) for the Fraser Health Region and has demonstrated healthy outcomes for patients transferred back to their referring hospital.

=== Obstetrics and neonatal care ===
Royal Columbian Hospital was again ranked one of the top hospitals in the country in caring for infants in its NICU in the latest Canadian Neonatal Network report (2015).

The hospital's NICU, which cared for 528 of B.C.'s premature and vulnerable infants during the study period, was rated one of the best in the country at saving these high-risk babies. It achieved a 98.6 percent survival rate overall for its infant patients, this despite the fact that as a Level 3 NICU it also cares for some of B.C.'s "micro preemies". The hospital has consistently been in the top rankings over the roughly 18 years the Network has been producing the study.

=== Medical staff and care providers ===
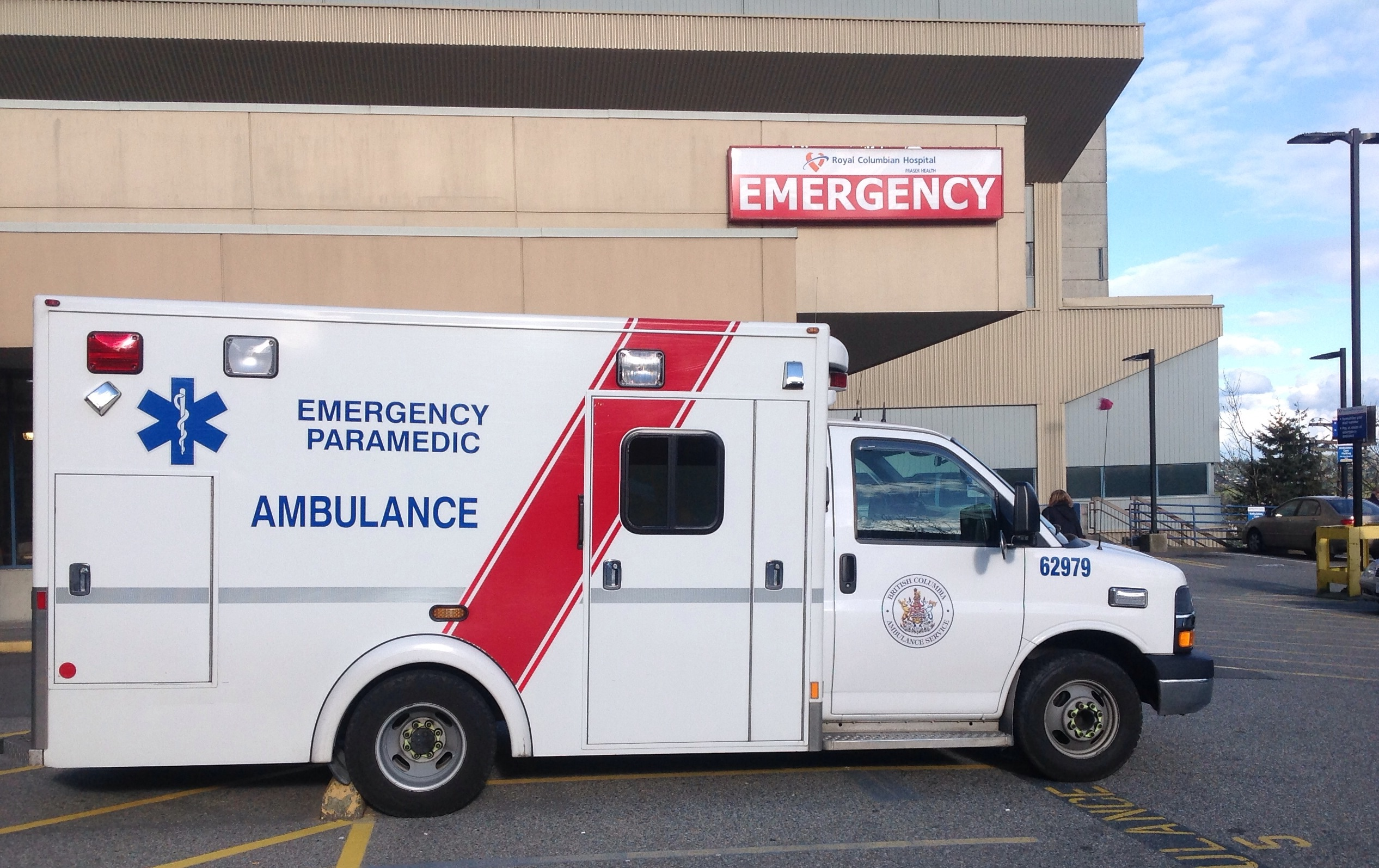

The hospital has 402 acute care beds and has a medical staff of approximately 385 physicians, divided between family physicians (150) and specialists (235). Many of the physicians also practice at Eagle Ridge Hospital in nearby Port Moody.

== History ==
In 1861, the public began to petition for a hospital along with backing from the Royal Engineers. At the time, a hospital's function was to serve as a charitable place for the community's most poor to be able to access some form of healthcare, and was a common institution in England. In a plea written by the British Columbian on July 11, 1861, it was stated that “our sick, for want of a hospital are dying alone and destitute in their own cabin.”. As a response, a municipal council was formed within the month to explore options. Initial fundraising came from surrounding areas such as Lillooet, who provided $600 in under an hour from its citizens who understood the need for a hospital. A tax of $1 per person was also enacted to help make up the difference, as well as some colonial grants.

The first Royal Columbian Hospital, designed for 30 patients and located on the corner of Clement (now 4th Street) and Agnes Street was opened on 7 October 1862 to care for men only. Women, children, and "the incurable and the insane" were excluded from care. The Royal Engineers planned and helped build the hospital, the first in the colony. The cost was $3,396. A chain gang from the penitentiary helped clear the site.

Royal Columbian moved to its current location in the Sapperton area of New Westminster in 1889; the large property purchased meant the hospital could expand and build additional structures. This new building is constructed in that year, however due to financial setbacks the patients are not moved until February 1890. An early physician and surgeon connected with the hospital at this location was Richard Irvine Bentley.

In 1893, the Christian Temperance Union established a women's hospital in a home, and had eight beds. In 1901, due to the lack of funds to keep the women's hospital running, provincial legislature was passed to integrate the women's hospital with Royal Columbian as well as establish a nurse's training school. The nurse's school was beneficial in that it provided a cheap form of labour that would eventually be trained to supervise and teach new students, which would prove to be beneficial in future years when finances became tight. The Ladies Auxiliary was formed in 1903, and in its first year set aside $600 for the hospital to build a maternity cottage.

In the 1920s, the economic boom that took place allowed for the hospital to continue to reduce its debt load and expand where needed. The standardization movement taking place in the United States provided footing to compel the municipalities to finally begin funding the hospitals that served their citizens. A paediatric ward opened in 1921 that allowed younger patients to be attended to separate from the adults, and a doctor was appointed as medical superintendent, as the lady superintendent felt that the job would be better suited to someone more medically trained. However, due to a tacit rejection of his recommendations by the staffed doctors, he resigned along with the newly appointed laboratory attendant.

The standardization movement made its way to British Columbia and Dr. Malcolm MacEachern, the physician from Vancouver General Hospital was at the forefront of it. In 1927 it was determined by American College of Surgeons, the hospital board, and the Fraser Valley Medical Association that certain requirements had to be met in order to be approved as meeting standardization requirements. At that time, it was required to have a pathologist spend a minimum amount of time reviewing lab work, a radiologist to supervise the x-ray department, and further administrative organization changes relating to staff, conferences and regulations. Royal Columbian was among the better performing hospitals due to its filing systems and regular meetings.

A major development for the hospital was the construction of the 130-bed Health Care Centre, opening on August 8, 1978, at a cost of $27 million. The ceremonial opening of the Healthcare Centre was done by Prince Philip, his son Prince Andrew, and Health Minister Bob McClelland. The centre added a wide range of treatment facilities and medical functions linked to sophisticated technology such as a CT scanner, which was officially opened May 31, 1980, by the Hon. Rafe Mair, Minister of Health. The Royal Columbian Hospital Foundation was incorporated under the Societies Act on 28 March 1978 to raise funds for the hospital's first CT scanner.

In addition to the opening of the Health Care centre, another building was opened during this time period, the Sherbrooke Centre Department of Psychiatry. The building was officially opened on February 27, 1981, by the Minister of Health James Nielson. Housed in the former nurse's residences building, the space was reutilized to include 30 beds to specifically care for patients with mental health issues.

Cardiac surgery was implemented in the hospital in 1991 in tandem with angioplasty to alleviate the backlog of surgeries and reduce the wait time for British Columbians. The cardiac surgery program performed 250 cardiopulmonary bypass (CPB) procedures in the first year. Since the hospital had the busiest cardiac care centre, the new ability to perform open-heart surgery cemented their role as a major Cardiac Centre for the region.

Hon. Ella Campbell Scarlett M.D was the first woman doctor at the Royal Columbian Hospital.

== Academic affiliations ==
Royal Columbian Hospital housed a nursing school between 1901 and 1978 in the Sherbrooke building. In 1950, it began accepting medical residency students. In 1988, it formalized its role as an educative campus with UBC. It was reaffirmed in 2002 with the development of the hospital as a Clinical Academic Campus, complete with a clinical teaching unit that educates undergraduate and postgraduate medical students. It now accommodates administration and mental health clinical services. Currently, Royal Columbian is a Clinical Academic Campus affiliated with the Faculty of Medicine of the University of British Columbia, the first in the Fraser Health region.

== Redevelopment ==
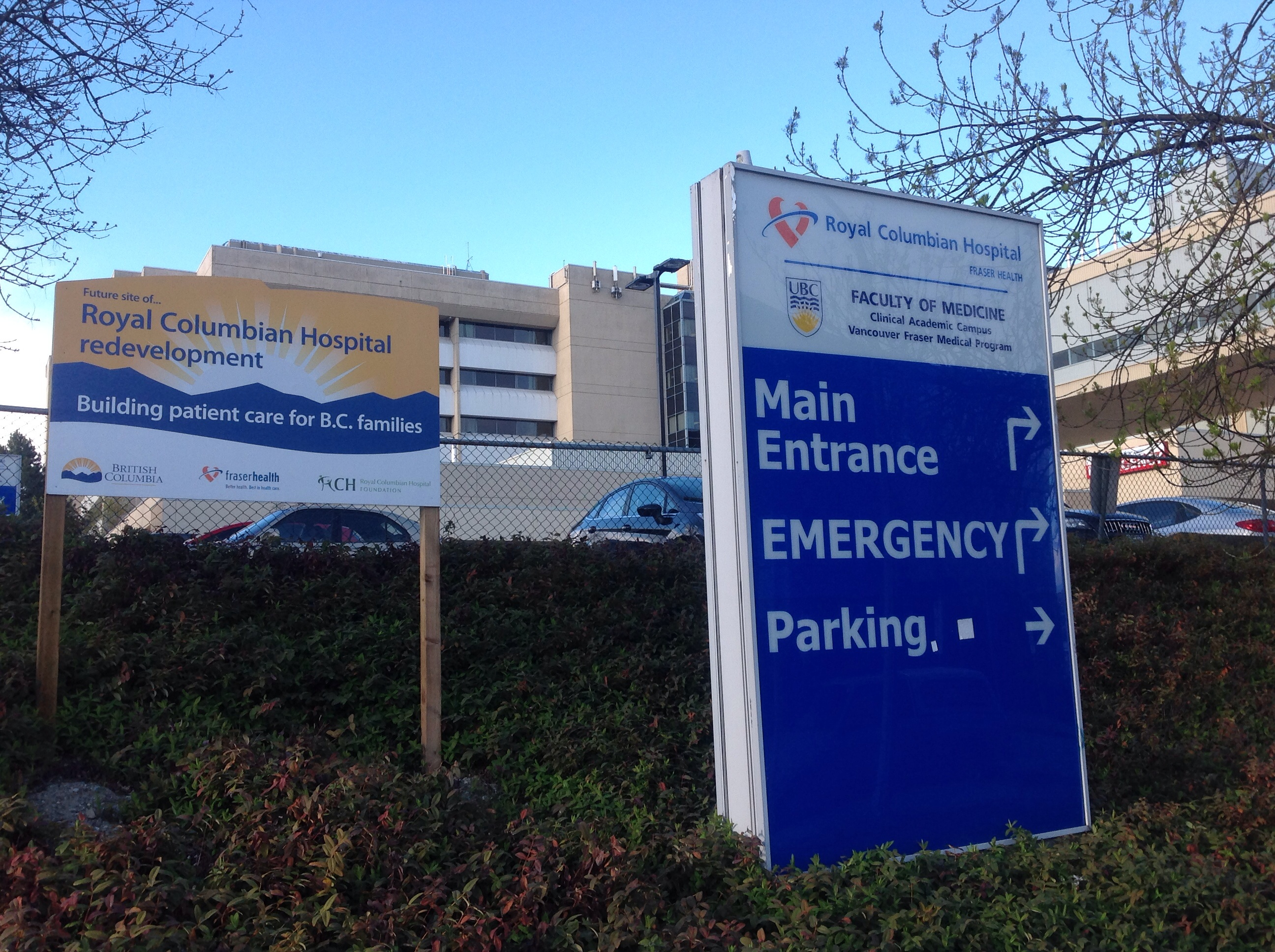
Government sign commits to future redevelopment at RCH.

Royal Columbian Hospital is undergoing a 3 phase redevelopment project expanding the hospital's capacity to address aging infrastructure and a congested emergency department. The redevelopment is expected to transform and renew nearly every aspect of the hospital.

In June 2012, the provincial government committed to the expansion and renovation of the hospital.

In 2015, the province approved the business plan for Phase 1 of the redevelopment.

In 2017, Phase 2 and Phase 3 approvals were announced, costing around $1.3 billion.

=== Phase One (2016–2020) ===
Phase one of the project marked the construction of a new 75-bed mental health and substance use wellness centre (MHSUWC), which opened to patients in July 2020.

Prior to completion in July 2020, the phase one facility was designated as an offsite medical centre to help with the Provincial Government's response to the COVID-19 pandemic, however it was not used for this purpose.

=== Phase Two ===
Phase two of the project marked the construction of a new 388-bed, 10-storey tower (JPACT; Jim Pattinson Acute Care Tower), featuring a larger emergency department, medical inpatient units spanning five floors, a 47-bed intensive care unit, a 17-bed cardiac intensive care unit, a 48-bed obstetrics unit with a neonatal intensive care unit, and 17 new operating rooms. The emergency department, critical care units, and operating rooms opened on May 31, 2026.
