= Eagle Ridge Hospital =

- Fraser Health

Geography
- Location: 475 Guildford Way, Port Moody, British Columbia, Canada
- Coordinates: 49.285350°N 122.82362°W

Organization
- Care system: Public Medicare (Canada)
- Type: General
- Affiliated university: Fraser Health

Services
- Emergency department: Yes
- Beds: 106

History
- Founded: 1984

Links
- Website: www.fraserhealth.ca/Service-Directory/Locations/Port-Moody/eagle-ridge-hospital
- Lists: Hospitals in Canada

Eagle Ridge Hospital (ERH) is a small general hospital located in Port Moody, British Columbia, on the Port Moody/Coquitlam border. ERH is one of 12 hospitals under the jurisdiction of Fraser Health, which services more than 1.3 million people.

Eagle Ridge Hospital officially opened its doors on 7 April 1984 and operates a 24-hour emergency department, ambulatory, long-term care and acute care programs. It is a Centre of Excellence for elective surgery for urology, obstetrics and gynaecology, plastics and orthopedics. The hospital also offers public education clinics for asthma, diabetes, rehabilitation services and programs for cardiology, children's grief recovery, youth crisis response and early psychosis prevention.

Nearby Eagle Ridge Manor provides 24-hour care in a home-like environment for an additional 75 residents in private and semi-private rooms.

== Amenities ==
- 24-Hour Emergency
- Crossroads Inlet Centre Hospice
- Elective inpatient and day surgery
- Endoscopy
- Early psychosis management and youth crisis response
- Children's grief recovery
- Outpatient clinics for asthma and diabetes
- Laboratory services
- Surgical daycare
- Minor surgical and medical procedures
- Pre-admission clinic
- Post-anesthesia recovery room
- Regional referral centre for rehabilitation for people recovering from stroke, brain injuries, heart attacks, and amputations
- Diagnostic services - general radiography, fluoroscopy, ultrasound, Doppler echocardiography, and CT scanning

== Eagle Ridge Hospital Foundation ==
The Eagle Ridge Hospital Foundation was created in 1982 to raise funds for the equipment the hospital needs to stay abreast of technological change, and to replace worn and outdated items. More than 60% of all new hospital equipment is bought with money raised by the Foundation, which sponsors special events including dinners, auctions, and a charity golf tournament.
