= Russell Lake =

Russell Lake or Lake Russell may refer to:

== Canada ==
- Russell Lake (Nova Scotia), a small lake in Dartmouth, Nova Scotia
- Russell Lake West, Nova Scotia an area of eastern Dartmouth, Nova Scotia

== United States ==
- Lake Russell (prehistoric), a prehistoric lake in Mono Basin, California
- Russell Lake (Minnesota), a lake in Crow Wing County
- Russell Lake (New York), a lake in Delaware County
- Richard B. Russell Lake, a man-made lake created by the Richard B. Russell Dam in South Carolina
- Glacial Lake Russell, a prehistoric lake formed at the toe of the Vashon Glacier in Puget Sound, Washington

== See also ==
- Lake Russell (coach) (1898–1980), American football coach
