= Victoria General Hospital (Halifax, Nova Scotia) =

Coordinates: 44°38′17″N 63°34′52″W

- Capital District Health Authority
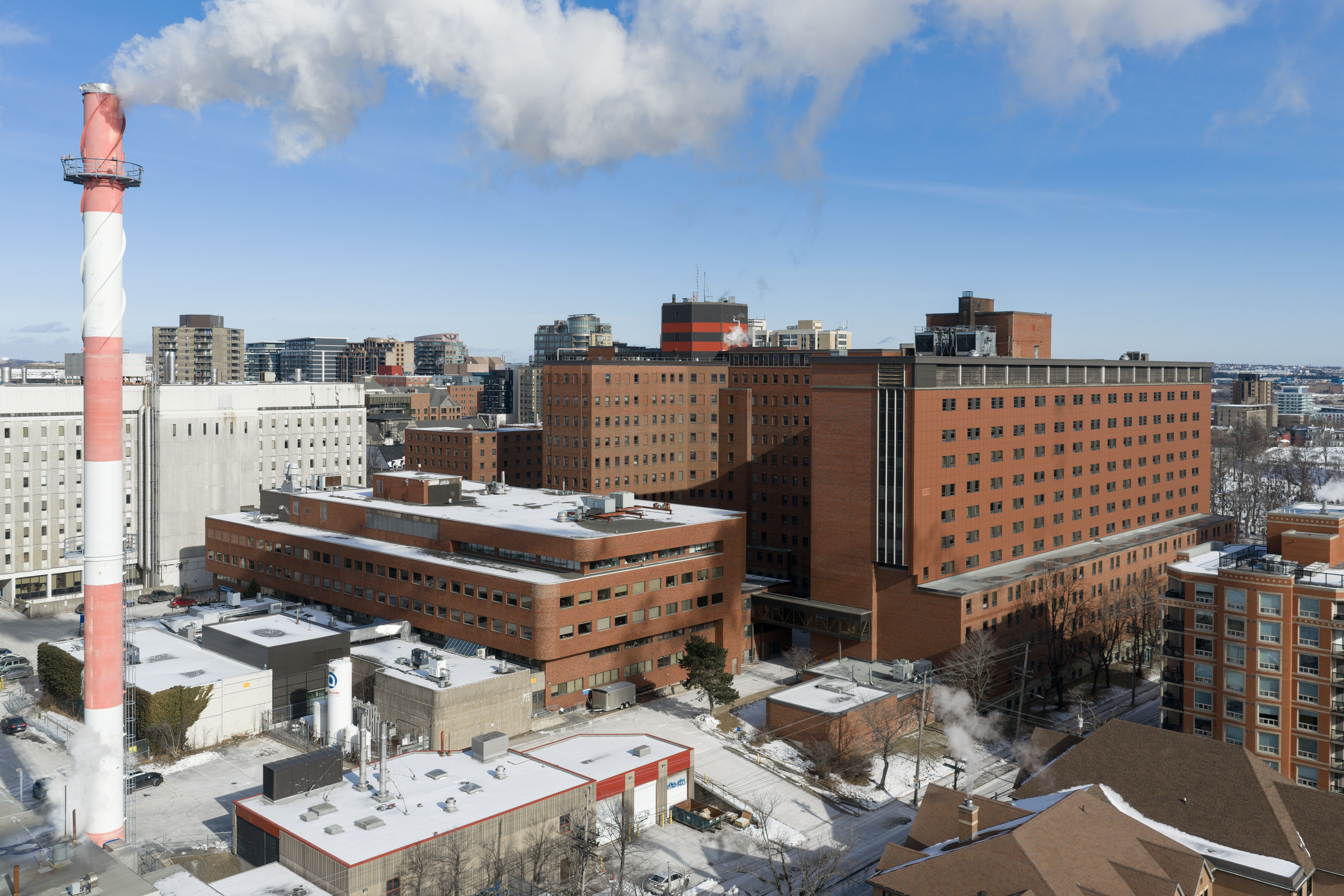
- The building in 2026

Geography
- Location: 1276 South Park Street; Halifax, Nova Scotia, Canada

Organization
- Care system: Public Medicare (Canada)
- Type: Teaching
- Affiliated university: None

Services
- Emergency department: No (Relocated to Halifax Infirmary)
- Beds: 900

History
- Founded: 1887

Links
- Lists: Hospitals in Canada

Victoria General Hospital is a hospital in Halifax, Nova Scotia, Canada, and part of the Queen Elizabeth II Health Sciences Centre, which began as the City Hospital in 1859.

== History ==
The Victoria General Hospital was founded in 1867, when the City of Halifax and the provincial government renamed the existing City and Provincial Hospital at the same location. The City and Provincial Hospital had been built in 1859 on a swampy field near South Park Street, after years of debate and fundraising among the city’s medical and political elites. The project cost $38,000, which was paid by the city of Halifax. However, the hospital faced many challenges with its infrastructure and services, and remained largely unused until 1867, when it admitted its first patient. In 1887, the hospital was renamed again as the Victoria General Hospital, in honour of Queen Victoria’s Golden Jubilee. The hospital grew over the years, adding new buildings, facilities, and services. It became one of the largest and most renowned hospitals in Canada, and a teaching hospital affiliated with Dalhousie University.

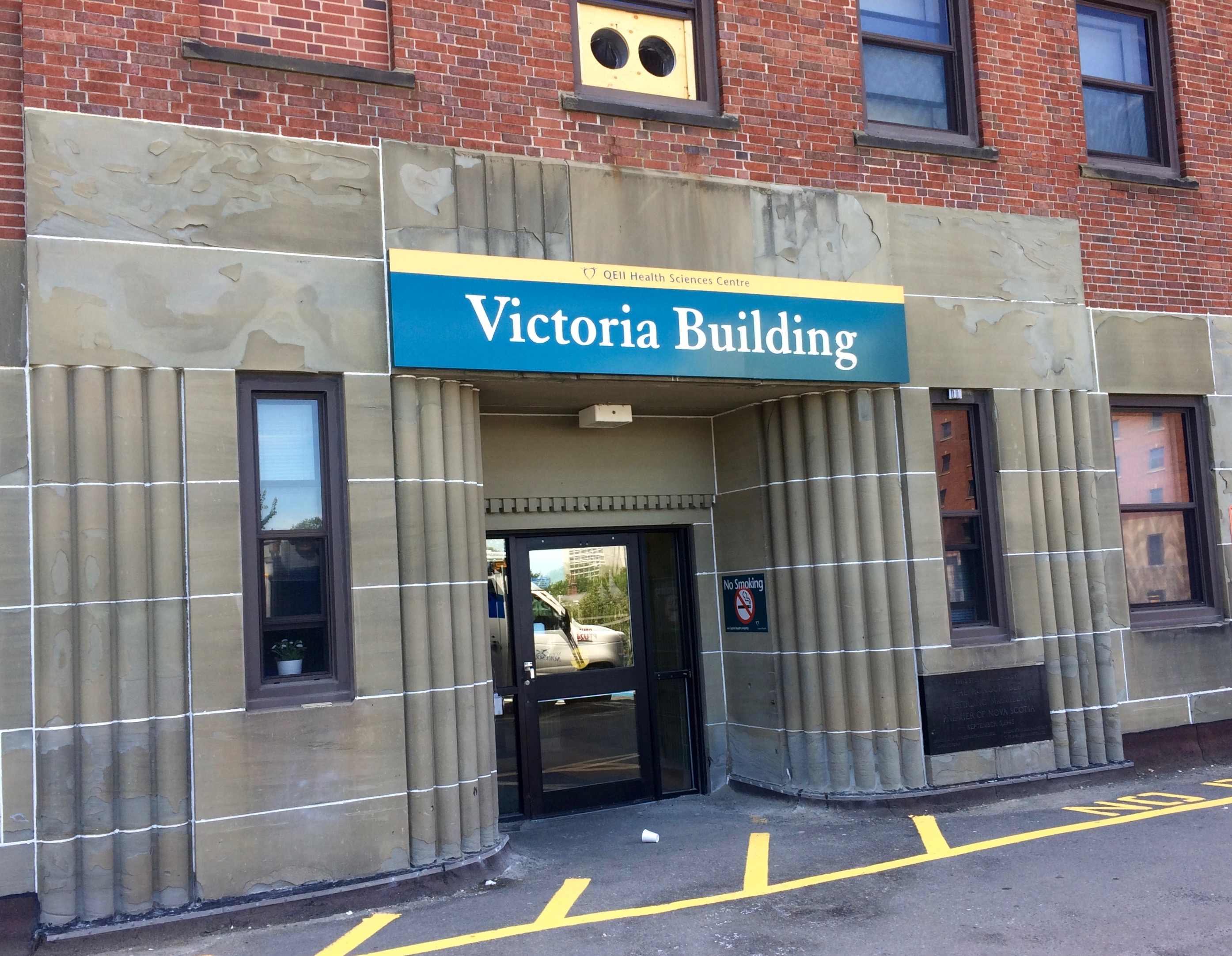
The entrance to the Victoria Building, built in 1945.

Some of the notable events and achievements in the hospital’s history are:

- In 1890, the hospital opened the first nursing school in Nova Scotia, which trained hundreds of nurses until its closure in 1995.
- In 1898, the hospital established the first X-ray department in Canada, and in 1904, the first radium therapy department in the British Empire.
- In 1917, the hospital was severely damaged by the Halifax Explosion, which killed 23 staff members and patients and injured many more. The hospital staff heroically continued to treat the wounded despite the chaos and destruction.
- In 1920, the hospital opened the first children’s ward in Nova Scotia, which later became the basis for the IWK Health Centre, a separate children’s hospital.
- In 1931, the hospital performed the first successful blood transfusion in Nova Scotia, and in 1938 the first electrocardiogram.
- In 1948, the hospital opened a new building on University Avenue, which was the largest and most modern hospital in the province at the time. The building featured 900 beds, 25 operating rooms, and various specialized departments and clinics.
- In 1954, the hospital performed the first open-heart surgery in Atlantic Canada, and in 1968, the first kidney transplant.
- In 1967, the hospital opened the Centennial Building, a 13-storey tower that was designed to accommodate the latest medical technology and research. The building was named in honour of Canada’s centennial anniversary.
- In 1994, the hospital became part of the Queen Elizabeth II Health Sciences Centre, a network of hospitals and health facilities in Halifax. The hospital continued to provide tertiary care, teaching services, and specialized programs such as cancer care, neurology, and cardiology.
- In 1998, the hospital performed the first liver transplant in Atlantic Canada, and in 2000, the first heart–lung transplant.

The Victoria General Hospital has a history of serving the people of Nova Scotia and beyond and of advancing the field of medicine through innovation and excellence. However, the hospital also faces many challenges and criticisms, such as aging infrastructure, frequent flooding, infection outbreaks, and overcrowding. The provincial government has announced plans to demolish and replace the hospital by 2026 as part of a major redevelopment project for the health care system.

=== Hospital Superintendent ===
- Dr. Henry S. Jacques 1890–1892
- Dr. A. P. Reid 1892–1898
- Wallace W. Kenney 1898–1931
- Dr. George A. MacIntosh
- Dr. C. M. Bethune 1946–1969

== Modern history ==
In 1948 a new Victoria General Hospital was opened immediately east of the land which would eventually become home to the IWK Health Centre, a children's hospital, on a block bounded by Tower Road, University Avenue and South Street and was the largest hospital in the province in terms of both staff and bed capacity. A hospital parking area was established in the lot between Tower Road and South Park Street; in the 1980s the lot was expanded to physically join with the hospital facilities, effectively dividing Tower Road into two sections north and south of the facility. Historically, "the VG", as it is called, was aligned with the Dalhousie University Faculty of Medicine as the province's only teaching hospital. The Victoria General Hospital's emergency department was closed and consolidated at the new Infirmary site in 1998.

== Victoria Building cornerstone ==
The cornerstone reads: This stone was laid by The Honourable A. Stirling MacMillan Premier of Nova Scotia September 5, 1945, Brookfield Construction Co Ltd. Andrew R Cobb Architect and C. St. J. Wilson Associate.

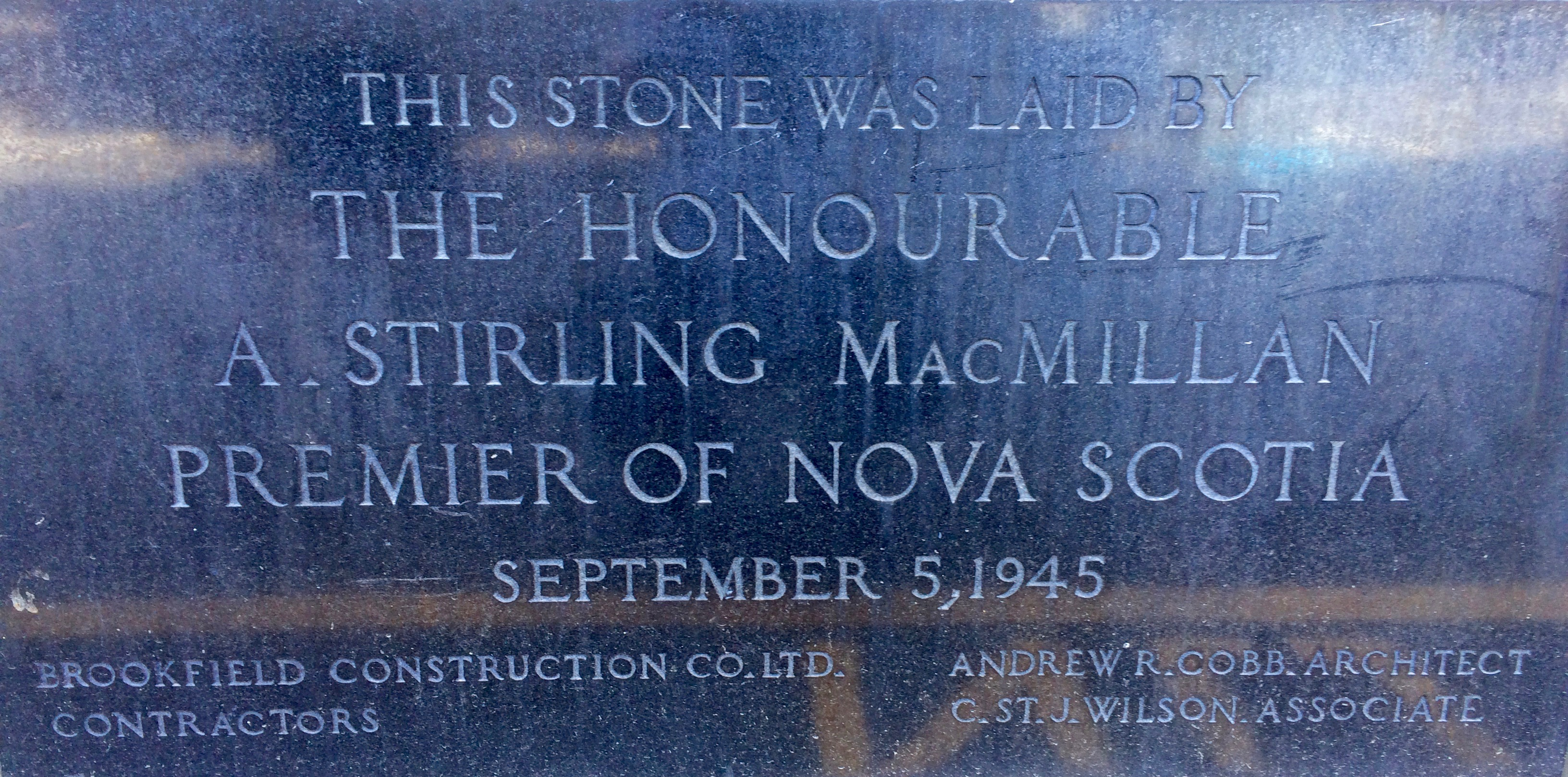
The Corner Stone for the Victoria General Hospital Building.

=== Site buildings ===
- Bethune
- MacKenzie
- Centre for Clinical Research
- Dickson
- Victoria
- Centennial

=== First patient ===
A farmer named Mr. Hubley was the first patient of the new hospital; he was treated for his strophulus ankle joint in 1887. Strophulus, also known as papular urticaria, is a rash in infants marked by red or sometimes whitish papules surrounded by reddish halos and popularly associated with teething distress. Mr. Hubley had a severe case of strophulus that affected his ankle and made it difficult for him to walk. He was admitted to the hospital on April 15, 1887, and received treatment from Dr. Charles Putter, the hospital’s accountant and one of the signatories of the requisition for the first ambulance. Mr. Hubley’s condition did not improve much, and he was discharged on April 29, 1887, with instructions to apply a poultice of bread and milk to his ankle.

== VG archive & museum ==
The archives and museum were set up in 1982 by nursing and physician staff at the hospital through the VG nursing school. Local historian nurse Madeline McNeil, who worked in the Victorian-era 1887 hospital as a nursing student, and Dr. Ron Stewart have been active members of the museum and VG archive.

The VG archives and museum were first organized by Alfreda McQuade (VG class 1919) while a supervisor at the VG Hospital in 1938 along with several nurses; the items gathered were stored in a room in the old VG hospital. When the new nurses' residence (Bethune Building) was opened in 1952, two rooms were designated for displays and a storage area in the basement of the MacKenzie building. Elizabeth Brown (VG class 1950) was in charge of the archives at this time and soon was joined by Helen Abass (class 1950) and Don Carruthers (VG class 1941). By 1990 the volunteer staff consisted of Shirley Dicks, Madeleine McNeil (VG class 1947) and Marjorie Barteaux. In 1996 the VG School of Nursing Archives received the Phyllis Blakeley Award for Archival excellence. Currently the manager is Gloria Stephens (VG class 1953A).

== Ambulance services ==
The Victoria General Hospital has a long history of providing ambulance services to the city of Halifax and the surrounding areas. The hospital’s first ambulance was a single-horse cart that was stabled behind the Jubilee building, which opened in 1887. The requisition for the first ambulance was signed by accountant Dr. Charles Putter on March 10, 1867.

The hospital’s ambulance service evolved over the years as new technologies and vehicles became available. In 1928, the hospital purchased its first motor vehicle, a black Ford Model T that was nicknamed the “Black Moriah.” The vehicle was equipped with a stretcher, a first aid kit, and a siren. In 1949, the hospital acquired a 31-foot five-door ambulance that had push-button operation, air conditioning, electric fans, and leather seating. The vehicle could accommodate up to six patients and two attendants.

The hospital also pioneered the training and education of emergency medical assistants, who would later be known as paramedics. The first emergency medical assistants’ training program was initiated in 1958 under the leadership of Dr. Cain, the chief of surgery at the hospital. The program taught basic life support skills, such as cardiopulmonary resuscitation, oxygen administration, and bandaging. In 1987, the hospital established a 24-hour paramedic-trained unit at the Emergency Department, under the medical direction of Dr. Mike Murphy. The unit provided advanced life support services, such as intravenous therapy, defibrillation, and intubation.

The hospital’s ambulance service was transferred to the Emergency Health Services (EHS) in 1994 as part of a provincial restructuring of the pre-hospital care system. The hospital continues to work closely with the EHS and other hospitals and health facilities to provide timely and quality care to patients in need of emergency transportation.

== Services ==
- 1890: Training School for Nurses opened – one of the first in Canada
- 1904: first X-ray equipment was installed
- 1912: Facilities of Pathology opened
- 1919: further expansion of the hospital nurses' residence and private pavilion began
- 1964: Respiratory Therapy began as Inhalation Therapy, then Respiratory Technology, then the School of Respiratory Technology was developed

== Notable staff ==
- Dr. Ron Stewart
- Dr. Robert Scharf
