= Imperoyal, Nova Scotia =

Imperoyal
- Neighborhood
- Location within Nova Scotia
- Coordinates: 44°38′29″N 63°32′04″W
- Country: Canada
- Province: Nova Scotia
- Municipality: Halifax Regional Municipality
- Community: Dartmouth
- Community council: Harbour East - Marine Drive Community Council
- District: 6 - Harbourview - Burnside - Dartmouth East
- Postal code: B2W
- Telephone Exchanges: 902
- GNBC code: CAREL

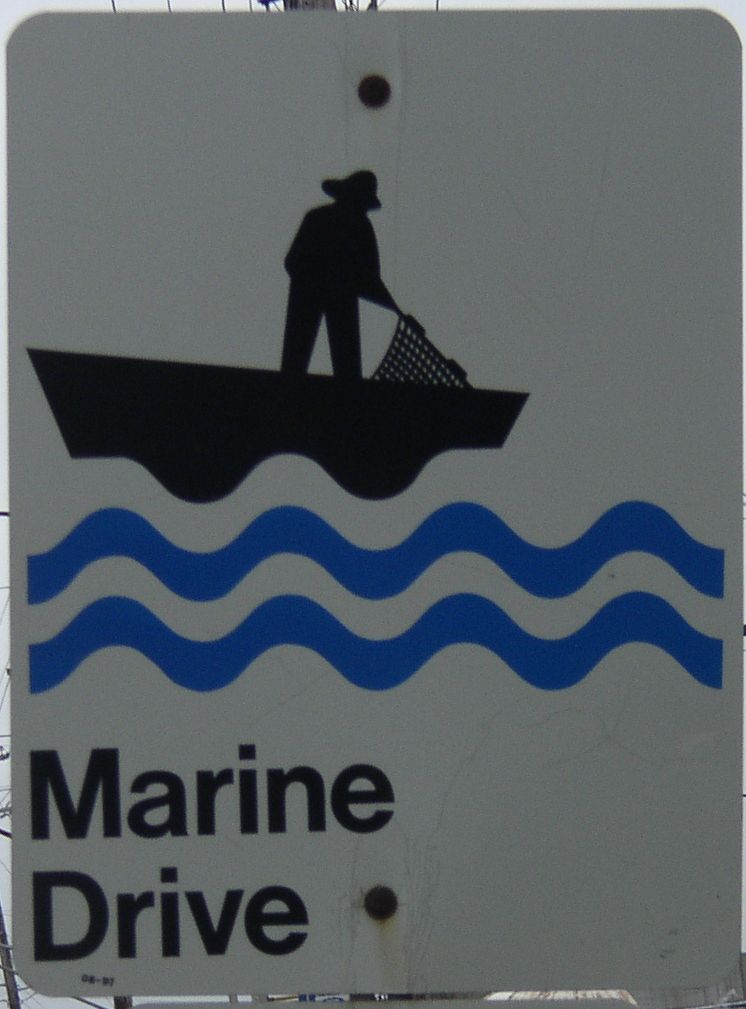
On Marine Drive

Imperoyal is a small neighbourhood on the eastern side of Halifax Harbour in the community of Dartmouth, Nova Scotia (part of the Halifax Regional Municipality). The area is mostly taken up by the former Dartmouth Refinery and by petroleum storage and transfer facility owned by Irving Oil Limited. A book on the topic is written by John D. Hartley entitled Imperoyal Village.

Most of the houses are owned by workers of the oil refinery or by the Canadian Forces in CFB Halifax and nearby Shearwater. The main road is Pleasant Street which is part of Route 322 which is also part of Marine Drive. The area is also known as South Woodside. Fort Clarence, a part of the "Halifax Defence Complex" was located in the present area of the Imperial Oil Refinery. A small display along Pleasant Street marks the place where the fort was.
