= Saint John Regional Hospital =

- Horizon Health Network
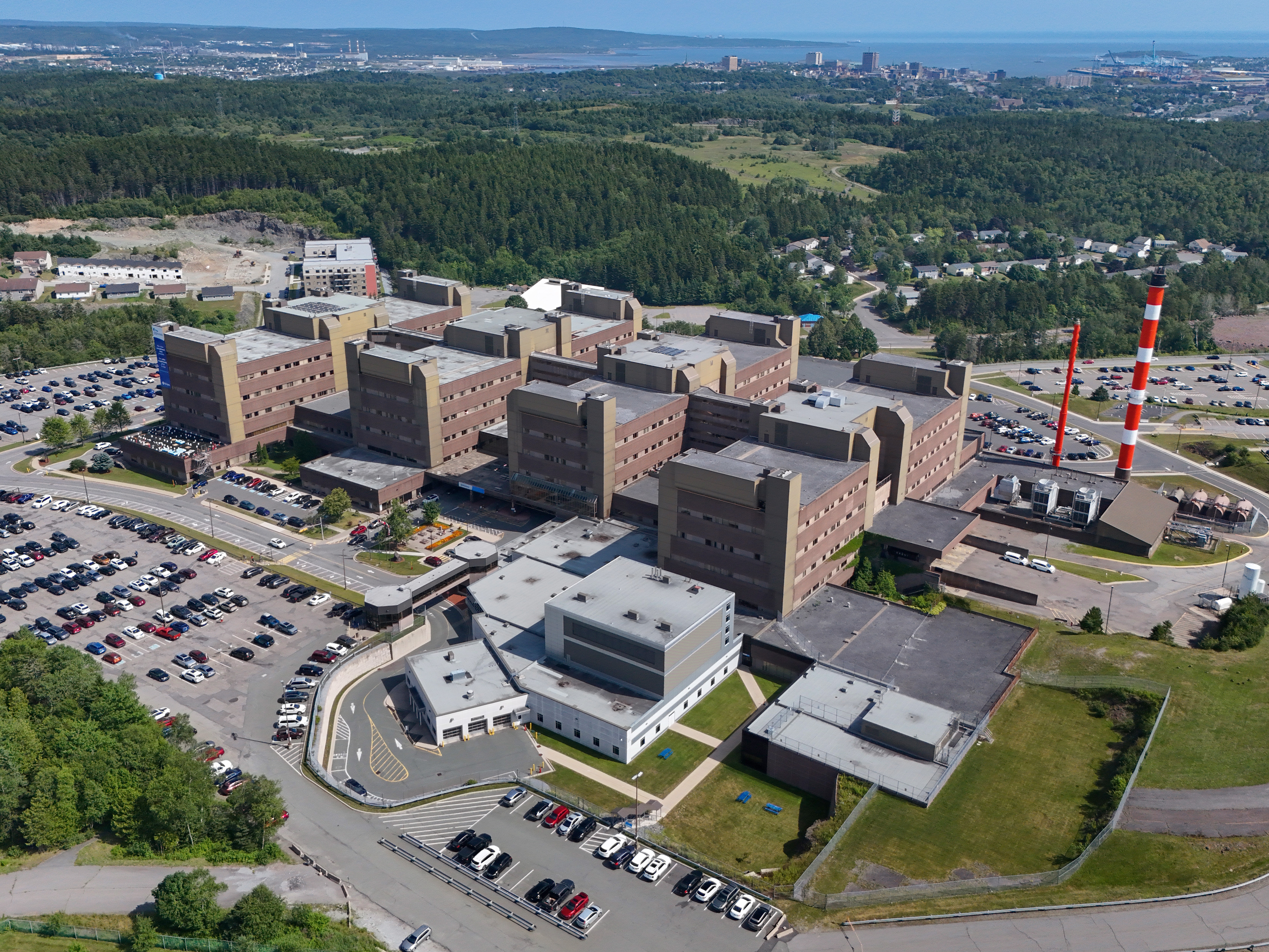
- Saint John Regional Hospital

- Location in New Brunswick

Geography
- Location: 400 University Avenue, Saint John, New Brunswick, Canada
- Coordinates: 45.3021°N 66.0849°W

Organization
- Care system: Public Medicare (Canada)
- Type: Teaching
- Affiliated university: University of New Brunswick, Dalhousie University Faculty of Medicine, New Brunswick Community College, Faculty of Medicine of Memorial University of Newfoundland

Services
- Emergency department: Level I trauma centre
- Beds: 524
- Speciality: Cardiac

Helipads
- Helipad: TC LID: CSN6

History
- Founded: 1982

Links
- Website: Saint John Regional Hospital
- Lists: Hospitals in Canada

Saint John Regional Hospital is a Canadian hospital in Saint John, New Brunswick.

Operated by Horizon Health Network, Saint John Regional Hospital opened in 1982, replacing the Saint John General Hospital and West Saint John Community Hospital facilities, creating the largest single health care facility in the province.

Saint John Regional Hospital is the largest tertiary care referral hospital in New Brunswick and specializes in cardiac (New Brunswick Heart Centre) and trauma care services.

Saint John Regional Hospital is also a teaching hospital for the Faculty of Medicine at Dalhousie University in Halifax, Nova Scotia as well as the Faculty of Medicine at Memorial University of Newfoundland in St. John's, Newfoundland and Labrador

It also provides training opportunities for nursing and other health care programs at the University of New Brunswick's Saint John and Fredericton campuses and the New Brunswick Community College.

== Services ==
- Addictions and Mental Health
- Clinical Services
  - Cardiac Surgery
  - Day Surgery
  - Dermatology
  - Dialysis (Nephrology)
  - Ear, Nose & Throat (Otolaryngology)
  - Emergency Department
  - Family Medicine
  - General Surgery
  - Gynecology Surgery
  - Gastroenterology
  - Geriatrics / Restorative Care
  - Infectious Disease
  - Intensive Care Unit (ICU)
  - Internal Medicine
  - Laboratory Medicine
  - Minor Surgery
  - Neonatal Intensive Care Unit (NICU)
  - Neurosurgery
  - Pediatrics
  - Palliative Care
  - Physiatry
  - Plastic and Burns Unit
  - Psychiatry
  - Obstetrics
  - Oncology
  - Ophthalmology (Eye) Surgery
  - Orthopedic Surgery
  - Plastic Surgery
  - Rehabilitation
  - Rheumatology
  - Sleep Centre
  - Thoracic Surgery
  - Urology Surgery
  - Vascular Surgery
- Support and Therapy
- Diagnostics and Testing
- Clinics
- Other Services
