= Capital District Health Authority =

- Capital Health (CDHA)
- Successor: Nova Scotia Health Authority
- Founded: 1 January 2001
- Defunct: 1 April 2015
- Merger of: Merged into Nova Scotia Health Authority
- Type: Health authority
- Headquarters: Halifax, Nova Scotia, Canada
- Region served: Halifax Regional Municipality and District of West Hants
- Services: Core, tertiary and quaternary healthcare
- President & CEO: Chris Power
- Affiliations: Dalhousie University Faculty of Medicine
- Employees: 9,985

The Capital District Health Authority (shortened to Capital Health or the Capital Health District) was the largest of the nine health authorities in the Canadian province of Nova Scotia. In 2015, it was merged into the new, province-wide Nova Scotia Health Authority.

== Service ==
Capital Health was responsible for delivering core health services in the Halifax Regional Municipality and in the Municipality of the District of West Hants, an area consisting of over 400,000 residents, or 40% of the provincial population. It also delivered tertiary and quaternary acute care services to residents throughout Atlantic Canada as a result of being the location of the region's largest teaching hospitals that make the city a major referral option for the provinces of New Brunswick, Prince Edward Island and Newfoundland and Labrador.

== Facilities ==
- Cobequid Community Health Centre (Lower Sackville)
- Dartmouth General Hospital (Dartmouth)
- East Coast Forensic Hospital (Dartmouth)
- Eastern Shore Memorial Hospital (Sheet Harbour)
- Hants Community Hospital (Windsor)
- Musquodoboit Valley Memorial Hospital (Middle Musquodoboit)
- Nova Scotia Environmental Health Centre (Fall River)
- Queen Elizabeth II Health Sciences Centre (Halifax)
  - Halifax Infirmary Site
    - Abbie J. Lane
    - Camp Hill Veterans' Memorial
    - Halifax Infirmary
  - Victoria General Site
    - Bethune
    - Centennial
    - Centre for Clinical Research
    - Dickson
    - Mackenzie
    - Nova Scotia Rehabilitation Centre
    - Victoria
- Nova Scotia Hospital (Dartmouth)
- Twin Oaks Memorial Hospital (Musquodoboit Harbour)

== Administration ==
The President and Chief Executive Officer of the Capital District Health Authority is Chris Power, a nurse with broad experience in primary health care and in health care administration.

Capital Health has seven volunteer Community Health Boards that advise the district administrators and encourage public participation in health planning.

Capital Health employs approximately 9,985 staff. and is affiliated with the Dalhousie University Faculty of Medicine.

Capital Health operates a charitable foundation which is chaired by Constance Glube, the 21st Chief Justice of Nova Scotia.

The District was an important participant in the 2004 Baker and Norton paper, printed in the Canadian Medical Association Journal, on Health System error.
