= Fort Clarence (Nova Scotia) =

Coordinates: 44.6399°N 63.5401°W

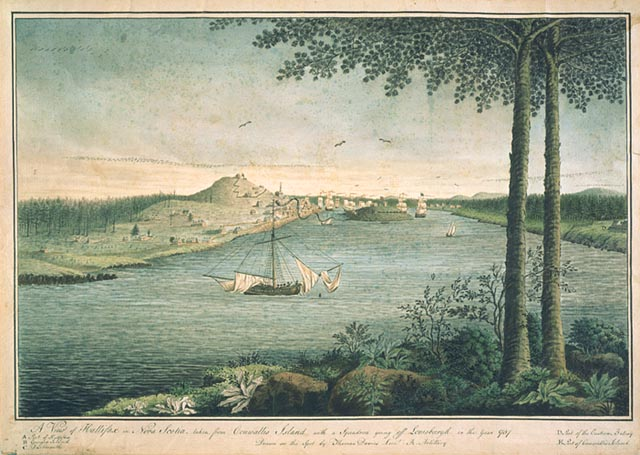
Eastern Battery (far right), The British Squadron going off to Louisbourg Expedition (1757)

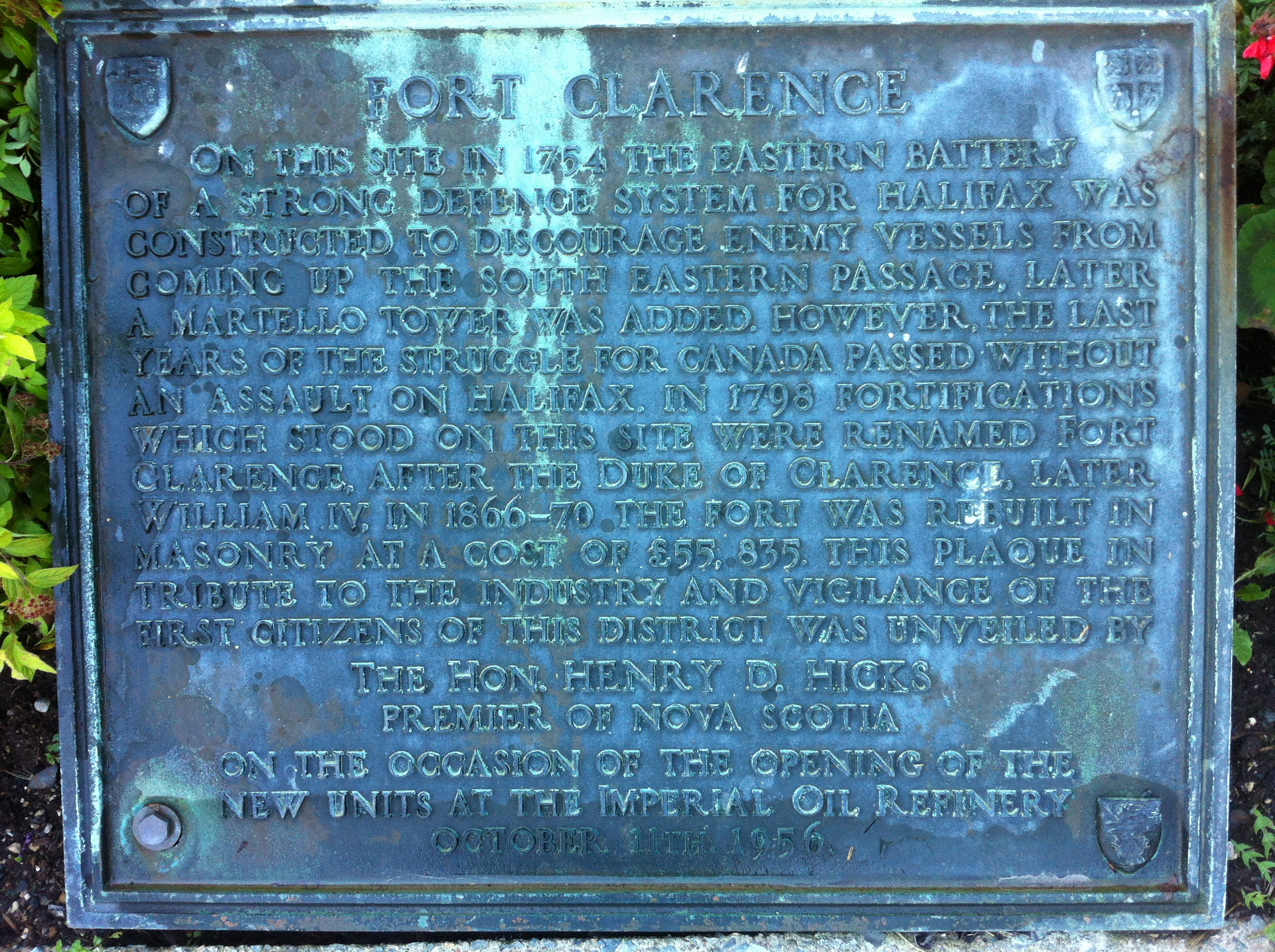
Fort Clarence (Eastern Battery) Plaque, Dartmouth, NovaScotia

Fort Clarence (formerly the Eastern Battery) was a British coastal fort built in 1754 at the beginning of the French and Indian War in Dartmouth, Nova Scotia (now part of Canada). The battery was built on the grant of Capt. John Rous. Governor Edward Cornwallis’ principal engineer John Brewse designed the fort which was 35 to 40 feet above sea level. There was initially a small battery of seven 12-pounder smooth-bore cannon. In spring 1759, a Mi'kmaq attack on the Eastern Battery killed five soldiers.

On 17 November 1778, the King's Orange Rangers arrived by sea at Halifax, probably to discourage desertions by relocating the men to a place much further away from their homes. The KOR was assigned to protect the Eastern Battery on the shore of Halifax harbour at the south end of Woodside, now the neighbourhood of Imperoyal.

Eastern Battery was renamed Fort Clarence by Prince Edward on 20 October 1798 in honour of his brother, the Duke of Clarence and St. Andrews, later King William IV. In the late 1790s, a Martello tower replaced the blockhouse. The fort was rebuilt with stone in the 1860s.

In 1929, Imperial Oil purchased the site, which became part of its Dartmouth Refinery, and the remaining pieces of the fort were buried in the 1940s. The refinery was converted to an oil storage depot in 2013. Archeologists have called for the fort to be excavated.

== See also ==
- Military history of Nova Scotia
- Military history of the Mi’kmaq people
- Royal Naval Dockyard, Halifax
