= Cumberland Regional Health Care Centre =

- Nova Scotia Health Authority
- Location in Nova Scotia

Geography
- Location: Upper Nappan, Nova Scotia, Canada
- Coordinates: 45.8041°N 64.1968°W

Organisation
- Type: Regional

Services
- Emergency department: Yes

History
- Opened: October 2002

Cumberland Regional Health Care Centre is a hospital near Amherst, Nova Scotia, Canada. Located next to Highway 104 in the rural community of Upper Nappan, Cumberland Regional serves residents of Cumberland County.

== History ==
A charitable organisation, the Highland View Regional Hospital Foundation, was established in 1993 to raise funds toward a replacement for the old Highland View Regional Hospital in Amherst.

In October 1997, Nova Scotia premier Russell MacLellan and health minister Jim Smith formally announced that the hospital would be replaced, with the province covering 75 per cent of the construction cost of a new facility.

The new hospital, designed by Halifax architecture firm William Nycum and Associates, was built with a floor area of approximately 163,000 square feet (15,100 m^{2}) and 78 acute care inpatient beds. The building is organised around a two-storey main corridor designed to allow natural light into the hospital interior. It opened in October 2002.

Initially operated by the Cumberland Health Authority, management of the hospital was transferred to the new Nova Scotia Health Authority after Nova Scotia's regional health authorities were dissolved in 2015.

The hospital made national headlines in January 2023 following the death of a 37-year-old woman, Allison Holthoff, after she waited around seven hours for treatment in the emergency department. The death has been viewed as emblematic of worsening crisis in Nova Scotia's healthcare system.

In January 2025, the Nova Scotia Government announced two expansions at the hospital; a new Emergency Department almost doubling ER capacity. The province anticipates the new ER will support over 23,000 patients annually. At the same time it was also announced that the hospital would be receiving a new, permanent, 12 chair kidney dialysis treatment centre. Currently the hospital has a temporary dialysis unit in retrofitted patient rooms, capable of serving 5 patients. The new dialysis centre will allow the hospital to double its capacity for treatment, alleviating travel needs for patients that are currently travelling to Moncton for treatment.

== Facilities ==
- Clinical Services
  - Day surgery
  - Emergency Department
  - General Surgery
  - Intensive Care Unit (ICU)
  - Obstetrics
- Support and Therapy
- Diagnostics and Testing
- Clinics
- Other Services
