= Russell Lake (Nova Scotia) =

Lake in Halifax Regional Municipality, Nova Scotia, Canada

Coordinates: 44°39′50.2″N 63°31′28.3″W

- Location within Nova Scotia
- Location: Halifax Regional Municipality, Nova Scotia
- Type: Eutrophic
- Primary inflows: Penhorn Lake
- Primary outflows: Cow Bay River (Morris Lake)
- Catchment area: 30.35 km^{2} (11.72 sq mi)
- Basin countries: Canada
- Max. length: 1.75 km (1.09 mi)
- Max. width: 0.39 km (0.24 mi)
- Surface area: 0.35 km^{2} (0.14 sq mi)
- Average depth: 3.7 m (12 ft)
- Max. depth: 9 m (30 ft)
- Water volume: 1,290,000 m^{3} (46,000,000 cu ft)
- Residence time: 4.6 months
- Shore length^{1}: 3.9 km (2.4 mi)
- Surface elevation: 36 m (118 ft)
- Frozen: 2 months
- Islands: 0
- Settlements: Dartmouth
- ^{1} Shore length is not a well-defined measure.

Russell Lake is a small shallow lake in Nova Scotia's Halifax Regional Municipality in the community of Dartmouth. The lake is bounded by the development of Russell Lake West to the west, Woodside to the south, Woodlawn to the north and Portland Estates to the east.
