= Shane Neilson =

Canadian physician and poet

- Born: 1975 (age 50–51); New Brunswick, Canada
- Occupations: physician and poet

Shane Neilson (born 1975) is a Canadian physician, author and poet.

== Life ==
Neilson was born in New Brunswick, Canada and trained in Dalhousie University Faculty of Medicine, followed by Memorial University of Newfoundland. He currently has a medical practice in Erin, and lives with his family in Guelph, Ontario.

Neilson has written two non fiction books about his experience as a physician Call Me Doctor and Gunmetal Blue.

== Poetry ==
His books of poetry include Complete Physical, Meniscus and Exterminate My Heart. In 2010, Neilson won Arc Poetry Magazine's 15th annual Poem of the Year contest.

In addition to being an author, Neilson is a notable critic and the poetry editor for Frog Hollow Press, and in 2005 he was editor for a collection of Alden Nowlan's medical poems called Alden Nowlan and Illness.

== Bibliography ==
- Shane Neilson (2003). The beaten-down elegies. Victoria, BC: Frog Hollow Press.
- Shane Neilson (2004). Two poems. Victoria, BC: Frog Hollow Press.
- Alden Nowlan; Shane Neilson (2004). Alden Nowlan & illness. Victoria, B.C.: Frog Hollow Press.
- Shane Neilson (1 April 2006). Call me doctor. Pottersfield Press. ISBN 978-1-895900-78-1.
- Shane Neilson; George Alexander Walker (2008). Exterminate my heart. Frog Hollow Press. ISBN 978-0-9784232-0-9.
- Shane Neilson; Jessica Hiemstra (2008). Light : poems. Victoria, B.C.: Frog Hollow Press.
- Shane Neilson; George A Walker (2008). Four maidens. Victoria, B.C.: Frog Hollow Press.
- Shane Neilson (2009). Approaches to poetry : the pre-poem moment. Victoria, B.C.: Frog Hollow Press.
- Shane Neilson (28 September 2009). Meniscus. Biblioasis. ISBN 978-1-897231-60-9.
- Shane Neilson (2010). Field hospital : the last writings of Lt. Colonel John McCrae. Saskatoon, Sask.: JackPine Press.
- Shane Neilson (1 June 2010). Complete Physical. The Porcupine's Quill. ISBN 978-0-88984-325-7.
- Shane Neilson (2010). Elision : the Milton Acorn poems. North Vancouver, BC: Alfred Gustav Press.
- Shane Neilson (15 May 2011). Gunmetal Blue:: Essays on Poetry and Medicine. Palimpsest Press. ISBN 978-1-926794-02-0.
- Jason Guriel; Shane Neilson (2011). Proofs & Equational love : the poetry of Jim Johnstone. Victoria, BC: Frog Hollow Press.
- Madeline Bassnett; Shane Neilson (2011). Elegies. Victoria, B.C.: Frog Hollow Press.
- Shane Neilson (2011). Fatherhood : the poetry of Wayne Clifford. Victoria, BC: Frog Hollow Press.
- Shane Neilson (2013). Will : stories. Winnipeg, Manitoba: Enfield & Wizenty.
- Shane Neilson (2013). Doctor Acorn : or: how I joined the Canadian Liberation Movement and learned to love the stern nurse fusion-bomb sun. Victoria, British Columbia: Frog Hollow Press.
- Shane Neilson (2014) "Able Physiologists Discuss Grief Musculatures." Jack Pine Press.
- Shane Neilson (2015) On Shaving Off His Face. The Porcupine's Quill.
- Shane Neilson (2018) Dysphoria. The Porcupine's Quill.
- Shane Neilson (2019) New Brunswick. Biblioasis.
- Shane Neilson (2019) Margin of Interest: Essays on English Language Poetry of the Maritimes. The Porcupine's Quill.
