= Dr. Everett Chalmers Regional Hospital =

- Horizon Health Network
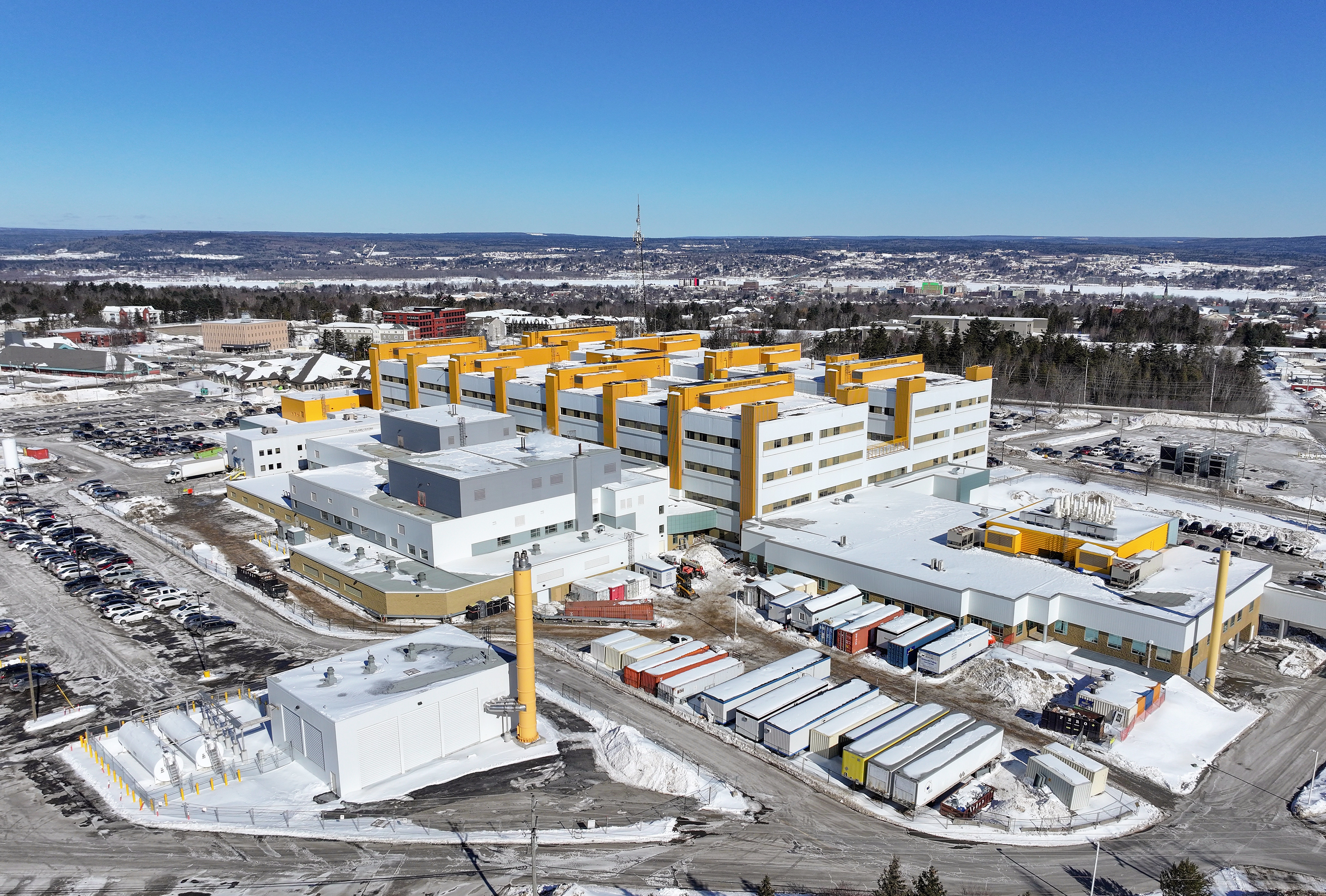
- The hospital in 2025

- Location in New Brunswick

Geography
- Location: 700 Priestman Street, Fredericton, New Brunswick, Canada
- Coordinates: 45°56′19.65″N 066°39′13.76″W

Organization
- Care system: Public Medicare (Canada)
- Type: Teaching
- Affiliated university: Dalhousie University Faculty of Medicine

Services
- Emergency department: Yes, level III trauma centre
- Beds: 315
- Speciality: Reconstructive surgery/Plastic surgery

History
- Founded: 1976

Links
- Website: Dr. Everett Chalmers Hospital
- Lists: Hospitals in Canada

The Dr. Everett Chalmers Regional Hospital is a Canadian hospital in Fredericton, New Brunswick. The hospital operates as a tertiary care referral hospital.

Operated by Horizon Health Network, formerly by the River Valley Health Authority, the Dr. Everett Chalmers Regional Hospital opened in 1976, replacing the Victoria Public Hospital. It is named in honour of George Everett Chalmers and was modelled after the McMaster University Medical Centre in Hamilton, Ontario.

In 2006, the Stan Cassidy Centre for Rehabilitation was relocated to a newly constructed building on the Dr. Everett Chalmers Regional Hospital campus, immediately south of, and connected to, the primary hospital building.

The hospital is also a teaching hospital for the Faculty of Medicine at Dalhousie University in Halifax, Nova Scotia.

== Services ==
- Addictions and Mental Health
- Clinical Services
  - Day Surgery
  - Ear, Nose & Throat (Otolaryngology)
  - Emergency Department
  - Family Medicine
  - General Surgery
  - Gynecology Surgery
  - Gastroenterology
  - Geriatrics / Restorative Care
  - Intensive Care Unit (ICU)
  - Internal Medicine
  - Neonatal Intensive Care Unit (NICU)
  - Minor Surgery
  - Pediatrics
  - Palliative Care
  - Physiatry
  - Psychiatry
  - Obstetrics
  - Ophthalmology (Eye) Surgery
  - Orthopedic Surgery
  - Plastic Surgery
  - Rehabilitation
  - Thoracic Surgery
  - Urology Surgery
  - Vascular Surgery
  - Oncology
- Support and Therapy
- Diagnostics and Testing
- Clinics
- Other Services

== See also ==
- List of hospitals in New Brunswick
