= Twin Oaks Memorial Hospital =

- Nova Scotia Health Authority
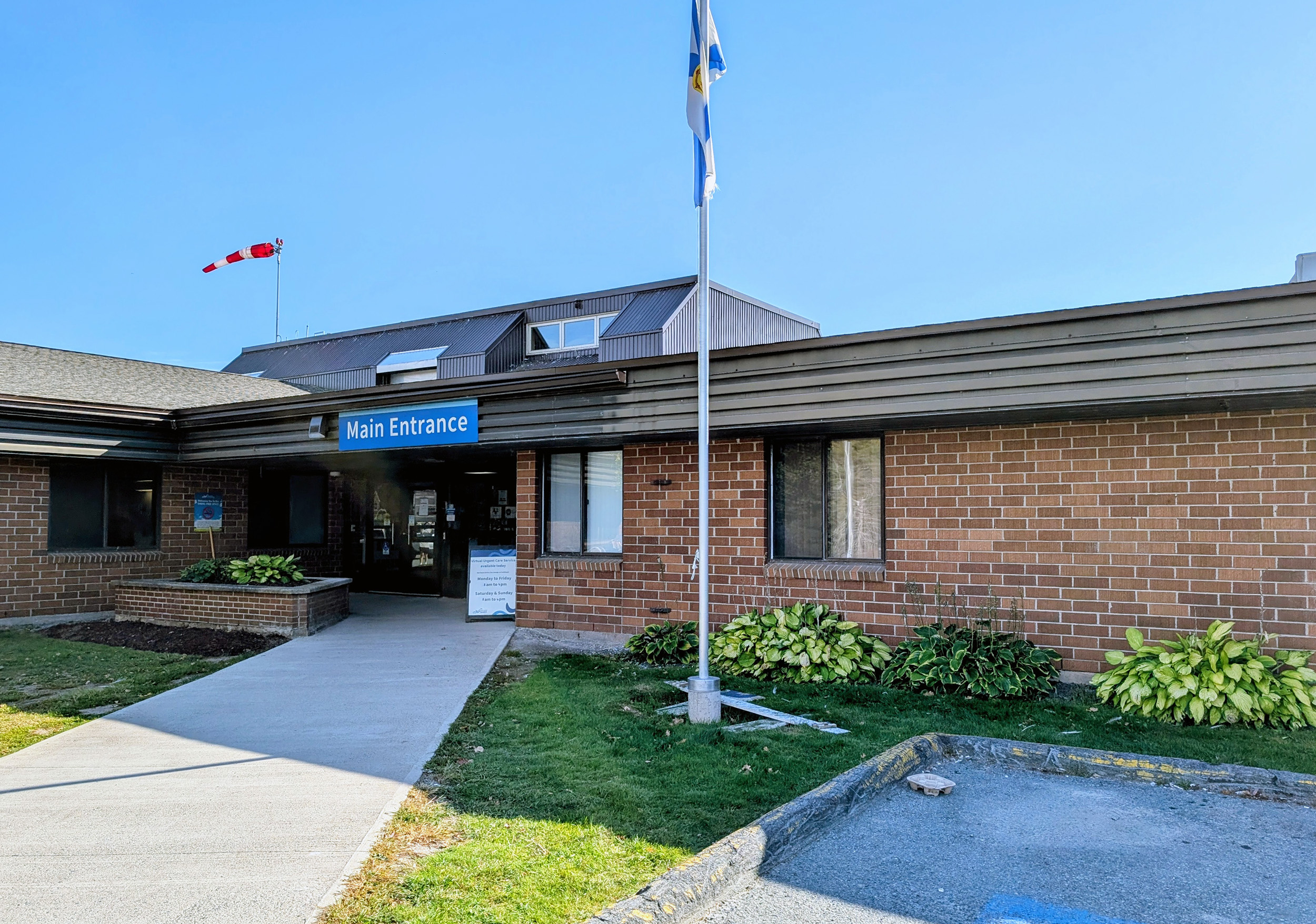
- Hospital entrance in October 2025

- Location in Nova Scotia

Geography
- Location: 7704 Highway 7 Musquodoboit Harbour; Nova Scotia, Canada
- Coordinates: 44.7830°N 63.1583°W

Organisation
- Care system: Public

Services
- Emergency department: Yes

History
- Opened: 8 June 1950

Twin Oaks Memorial Hospital is a Canadian public hospital in Musquodoboit Harbour, Nova Scotia, a rural community in the Halifax region. Originally opened as the Twin Oaks War Memorial Hospital in 1950, and reconstructed in 1976, the hospital is operated by the Nova Scotia Health Authority and has a 24-hour emergency department.

== History ==
Following World War II, the Red Cross began establishing "outpost hospitals" in isolated communities in Canada. The hospital was formally incorporated in 1945 with the support of P.H. Weary and the local Red Cross branch. Construction began on 5 July 1948.

The Twin Oaks War Memorial Hospital opened on 8 June 1950 and was operated by the Red Cross until the late 1950s. Subsequently, the hospital began to receive government funding.

A larger replacement hospital, designed by Halifax architecture firm Fowler, Bauld and Mitchell, was built by general contractor Cameron Construction. It was officially opened on 30 May 1976 by Nova Scotia premier Gerald Regan and minister of recreation Alexander Garnet Brown, the local MLA and a supporter of the project.

The original Twin Oaks Memorial War Hospital was adapted to become a long-term care home, The Birches, which opened in May 1979 and is affiliated with (and is physically connected to) the new hospital.
