= Nova Scotia Health Authority =

Health authority in Nova Scotia, Canada

- Company type: Health authority
- Founded: April 2015
- Headquarters: Halifax, Nova Scotia
- Area served: Nova Scotia
- Key people: Karen Oldfield, Interim CEO
- Revenue: 515,512 Canadian dollar (2003)
- Total assets: 376,967 Canadian dollar (2003)
- Number of employees: 23,400 (2015)
- Website: www.nshealth.ca

The Nova Scotia Health Authority is a provincial health authority serving Nova Scotia, Canada. It is the largest employer in the province, with more than 23,000 employees, 2,500 physicians and 7,000 volunteers working from 45 different facilities. Its largest hospital is the Halifax Infirmary which is part of the QEII Health Sciences Centre in Halifax.

== Facilities ==
The Nova Scotia Health Authority operates various facilities across the province of Nova Scotia:

Northern Zone

- Aberdeen Hospital
- All Saints Springhill Hospital
- Bayview Memorial Health Centre
- Colchester East Hants Health Care Centre
- Cumberland Regional Health Care Centre
- Lillian Fraser Memorial Hospital
- North Cumberland Memorial Hospital
- South Cumberland Community Care Centre
- Sutherland Harris Memorial Hospital

Western Zone

- Annapolis Community Health Centre
- Digby General Hospital
- Eastern Kings Memorial Community Health Centre
- Fishermen's Memorial Hospital
- Queens General Hospital
- Roseway Hospital
- Soldiers Memorial Hospital
- South Shore Regional Hospital
- Valley Regional Hospital
- Yarmouth Regional Hospital

Eastern Zone

- Buchanan Memorial Community Health Centre
- Cape Breton Regional Hospital
- Eastern Memorial Hospital
- Glace Bay Hospital
- Guysborough Memorial Hospital
- Inverness Consolidated Memorial Hospital
- New Waterford Consolidated Hospital
- Northside General Hospital
- Sacred Heart Community Health Centre
- St. Martha's Regional Hospital
- St. Mary's Memorial Hospital
- Strait Richmond Hospital
- Taigh Na Mara
- Victoria County Memorial Hospital

Central Zone

- Cobequid Community Health Centre
- Dartmouth General Hospital
- Eastern Shore Memorial Hospital
- Hants Community Hospital
- Musquodoboit Valley Memorial Hospital
- Queen Elizabeth II Health Sciences Centre
- Twin Oaks Memorial Hospital

Associated Indigenous Health Centres

- Eskasoni Community Health Centre
- Indian Brook (Sipekne'katik) Health Centre
- Membertou Health and Wellness Centre
- Theresa Cremo Memorial Health Centre in Whycocomagh (blood collection only)
- Wagmatcook Health Centre

== History ==
The Nova Scotia Health Authority was formed on April 1, 2015, as an amalgamation of nine existing regional authorities:

- South Shore District Health Authority
- South West District Health Authority
- Annapolis Valley District Health Authority
- Colchester East Hants Health Authority
- Cumberland Health Authority
- Pictou County Health Authority
- Guysborough Antigonish Strait Health Authority
- Cape Breton District Health Authority
- Capital District Health Authority

The authority received a $843,530 grant from the Public Health Agency of Canada's Immunization Partnership Fund to implement Nova Scotia's Enhanced Immunization Access Project. Between December 2019 and May 2020, parents of children born in 2011 were surveyed to collect up-to-date immunization records.

On September 1, 2021, the newly elected provincial government undertook wholesale changes in the NS Health Authority. The CEO and volunteer board members were released from their duties. An interim CEO was appointed. Karen Oldfield, newly appointed interim CEO, previously was the senior executive at the Halifax Ports Corporation.

The health authority has a history of medical professional misconduct scandals in Nova Scotia.
