= Russell Lake West, Nova Scotia =

Coordinates: 44°39′14.9″N 63°31′48.9″W

Russell Lake West
- Subdivision
- Interactive map of Russell Lake West
- Country: Canada
- Province: Nova Scotia
- Municipality: Halifax Regional Municipality
- Community council: Harbour East Community Council
- Planning Area: Dartmouth

Area
  - Total: 2.51 km^{2} (0.97 sq mi)

Russell Lake West is a planned residential subdivision and commercial development in the eastern part of the community of Dartmouth in the Halifax Regional Municipality, Nova Scotia. The area began construction in 2006 with the creation of Exit 8 on Highway 111, providing access from the southwest to the area via Mount Hope Avenue, which, as of October 2011, also provides direct access into Woodside Industrial Park. Russell Lake West is located next to the community of Woodside. Walking trails provide direct access to and from Woodside. The subdivision covers 251 ha (620 acres), and houses approximately 3,200 people.

== Business ==
The primary commercial area of Russell Lake West is located immediately adjacent to Exit 8 from Highway 111. There is a primary retail area centered on the 111 interchange with Mount Hope Avenue, with some pre-existing retail built between 2008 and 2010. More land in the area was zoned for commercial use. The recently constructed retail plaza, called Millstone Square, contains a mixture of small businesses, as well as larger retail tenants.

Millstone Square is a plaza style commercial area and is anchored by Sobeys, Kent Building Supplies, and Lawtons Drugs. Other tenants in Millstone Square include:

List Of Tenants
Restaurants
- Rocco's
- Sam's Seafood
- Grind House Cafe

Health/Wellness & Beauty

- All Yoga
- Millstone Square Dental Centre
- Eye World Ltd. Vision Care
- Natural Path Wellness Centre
- RANA Respiratory Care Group
- Richardson Orthondontics
- LinMac Hair Design
- Saigon Nails and Spa

Financial

- Bank of Montreal
- Shellnut Professional Accountants

Professional

- CB Richard Ellis Global Corporate Services
- Century 21 A.B.C
- Eastin Project Limited
- Meco

Services

- Russell Lake Animal Hospital
- Access Nova Scotia

Future Retail Development

A new 20 000 sq. ft. retail center "Baker Drive Centre" is currently available for pre-lease for Baker Dr. near Lindenwood Terrace. A new retail plaza is currently slated to be developed along Baker Dr. opposite to Millstone Square and Sobeys.

== Community ==
The residential portion of Russell Lake West is made up of a mix of low density single-family dwellings, as well as medium-density townhouses, higher-density condominiums, and apartment low-rises. Several of them cater to an elderly demographic. There is also a Shannex residence, "Parkland at the Lakes," located at the bottom of Baker Drive in the area near the lake opposite to Freshwater Trail.

With the neighborhood being located on Russell Lake, with many homes backing directly onto the lake itself, there are restrictions to residents including rules which restrict traffic on the lake due to the wildlife in the area.

An area (yet to be developed) on Basswood Terrace was initially a proposed site for an elementary school. However, due to Portland Estates Elementary School being located on the opposite side of the lake, the Halifax Regional School Board deemed it unnecessary for another school so close. As a result, the site was re-zoned for high-density residentials and is currently awaiting development.

One interesting item in the Russell Lake West area is the Osprey Nest at the northern head of Russell Lake itself near the water shed. The nest is perched on top of a pole placed there by Nova Scotia Power. The pole was put in place after it was noticed that numerous power outages were happening as a result of the nest being on a power pole in the area. Nova Scotia Power also installed a WebCam to view the nest and the egg hatching in Real-time.

The neighborhood covers about 251 ha (620 acres), and houses approximately 3,200 people.

== Parks ==
A series of walking trails run throughout the community, connecting streets at small open greenspaces and playgrounds and providing a connection to the trails that already existed around the north end of the shore of the lake in Russell Lake Park.

== Transit ==
Public transit is provided by Metro Transit on Route #57 which runs along Baker Drive through Russell Lake West, providing connections to the Woodside Industrial Park, the Woodside Ferry Terminal, Penhorn Terminal, Portland Hills Terminal, and connects the adjacent communities of Woodside, Portland Street, Portland Estates, and Portland Hills.
