= Cape Breton Regional Hospital =

- Nova Scotia Health Authority, Cape Breton District
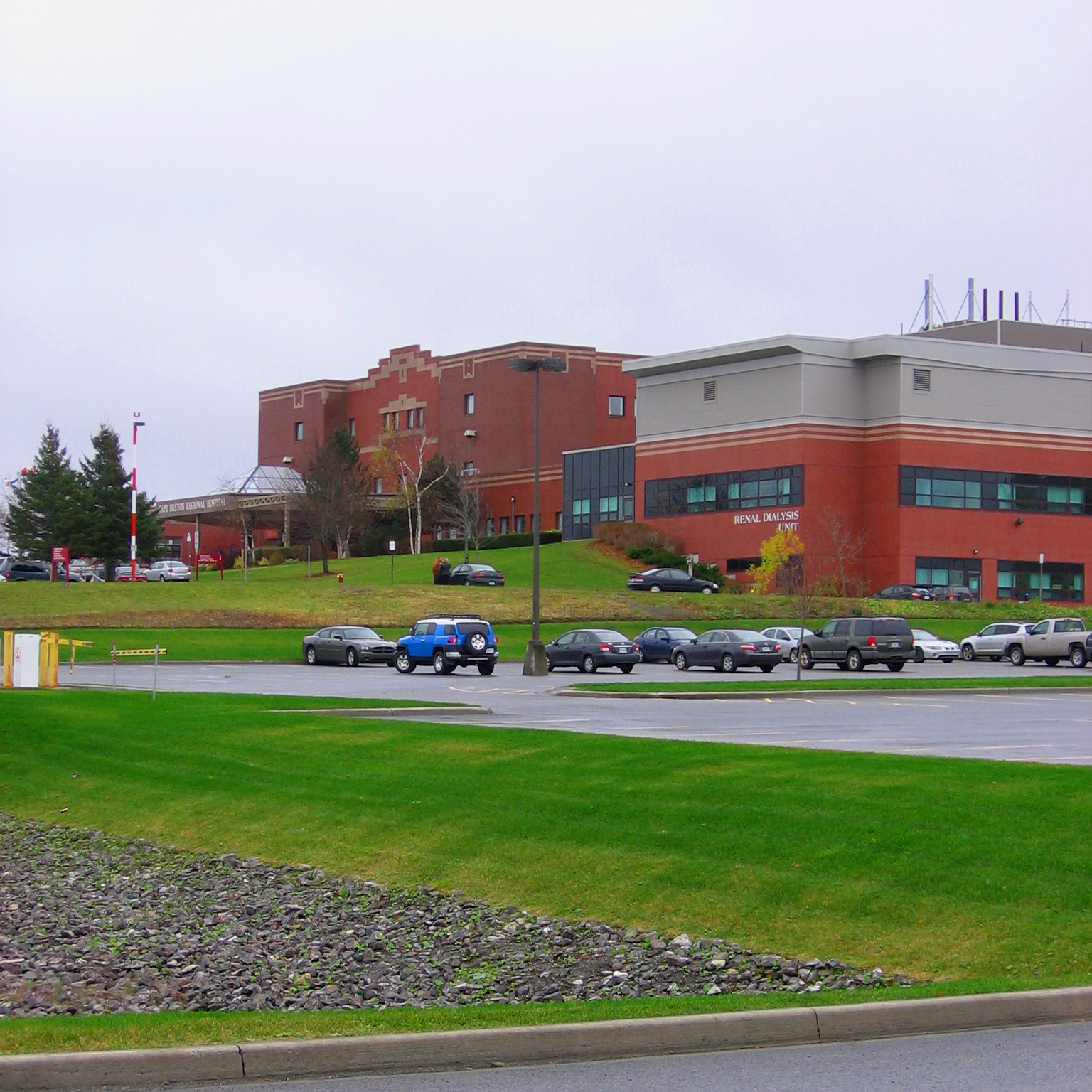

- Location in Nova Scotia

Geography
- Location: 1482 George Street, Sydney, Nova Scotia, Canada
- Coordinates: 46.11°N 60.17612°W

Organization
- Care system: Public Medicare (Canada)
- Type: Teaching
- Affiliated university: Dalhousie University Faculty of Medicine

Services
- Emergency department: Level III trauma centre
- Beds: 250 (?)

Helipads
- Helipad: TC LID: CSY9

History
- Founded: 1995

Links
- Website: Cape Breton Regional Hospital
- Lists: Hospitals in Canada

Cape Breton Regional Hospital is a Canadian hospital in Sydney, Nova Scotia.

Operated by the Nova Scotia Health Authority, the Cape Breton Regional Hospital opened in 1995, replacing the Sydney City Hospital (opened in 1916) and St. Rita's Hospital (opened in 1920).

Cape Breton Regional Hospital operates as a tertiary care referral hospital for residents of Cape Breton Island.

Cape Breton Regional Hospital is also a teaching hospital for the Faculty of Medicine at Dalhousie University in Halifax, Nova Scotia.

== See also ==
- List of hospitals in Canada
- Cape Breton Regional Municipality
