= Russell Lake (Minnesota) =

Lake of Crow Wing County, Minnesota, United States of America

- Location within Minnesota
- Location: Crow Wing County, Minnesota
- Coordinates: 46°18′21″N 94°7′8″W
- Type: lake

Russell Lake is a lake in Crow Wing County, in the U.S. state of Minnesota.

Russell Lake was named for T. P. Russell, a pioneer who settled there.

== See also ==
- List of lakes in Minnesota
