= Dartmouth Refinery =

Oil refinery in Nova Scotia, Canada

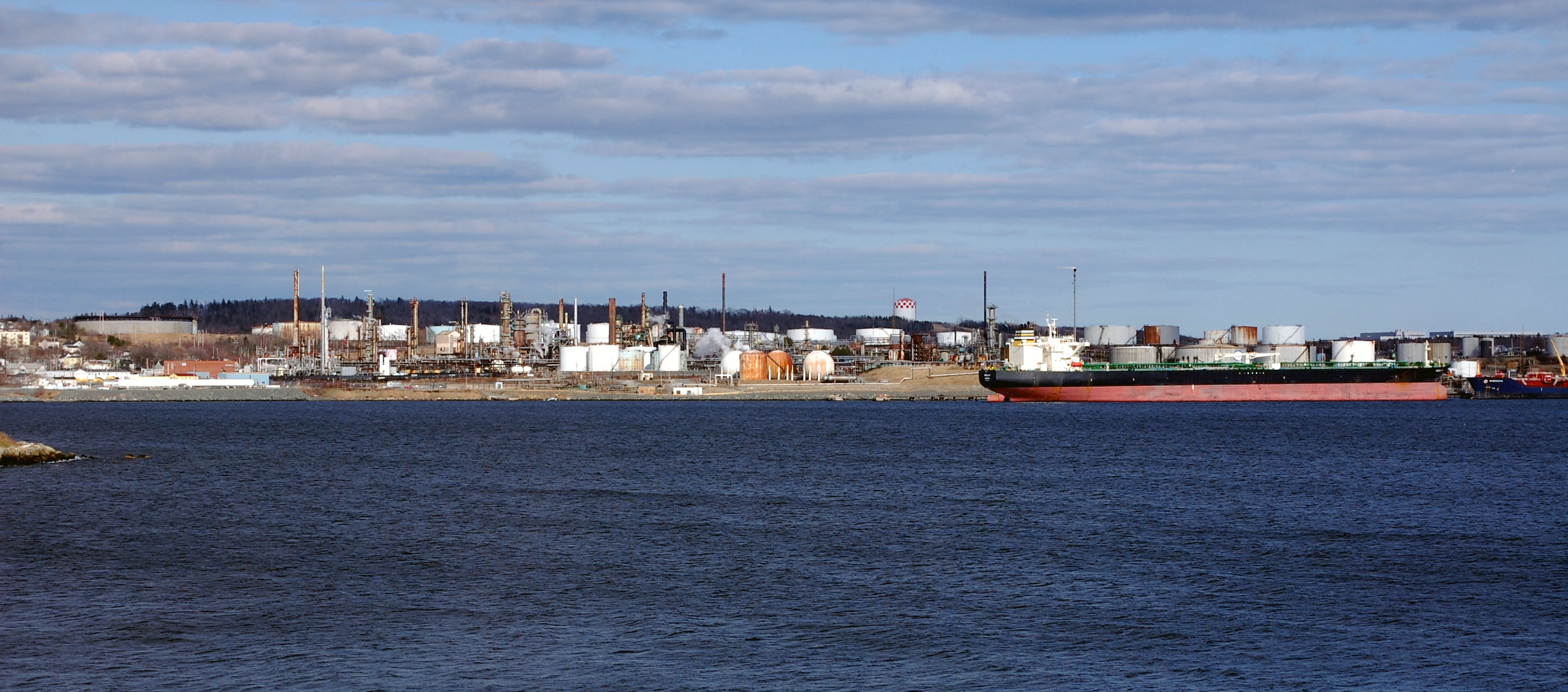

- Location of the Dartmouth Refinery in Nova Scotia
- Location: Dartmouth, Nova Scotia, Canada; 44°38′34.8″N 63°31′54.9″W

Refinery details
- Operator: Imperial Oil
- Owner: Imperial Oil
- Opened: 1918
- Closed: 2013
- Capacity: 89,000 barrels per day (14,100 m^{3}/d)
- No. of employees: 200
- No. of oil tanks: 88
- Refining center: Halifax

The Dartmouth Refinery is a former oil refinery in Dartmouth, Nova Scotia, owned by Imperial Oil. It was located on the eastern side of Halifax Harbour, and the crude oil arrived via ship. It covered some 400 hectares (990 acres) south of central Dartmouth, with the neighbourhood around it being known as Imperoyal.

== History ==
The refinery was founded in 1918, in part to meet the burgeoning needs of the First World War. It played an important role in the Second World War, providing the fuel for much of the Allied North Atlantic convoys. The site was originally the site of Fort Clarence, one of the eighteenth-century forts guarding the harbour against attack.

On July 21, 2011, the refinery was temporarily shut down due to damage sustained during an electrical storm. Scheduled maintenance was moved ahead to coincide with the repairs. Meanwhile, some fuel suppliers in the refinery's service area closed down due to a lack of supply and the wholesale price for gasoline in New York rose marginally.

=== Closing ===
On June 19, 2013, Imperial Oil announced that the company would be converting the refinery to a marine terminal planned for later in 2013. As a result, sales of Bunker fuel to commercial shippers in the Port of Halifax were phased out, asphalt and the production of butane and propane ended. The refinery was demolished over the period of Q42015-Q42017. More than 37,000 mt of steel was scrapped. The project plan required more than 300,000 man hours to flatten and then remove the buildings, vessels, and tanks.

== Refinery details ==
The refinery processed some 89,000 barrels per day (14,100 m^{3}/d). It was one of three refineries that supplied heating oil and gasoline to Atlantic Canada, the others being the considerably larger Irving Oil refinery in Saint John, New Brunswick and the Come By Chance Refinery in Newfoundland. The Dartmouth refinery supplied most of Nova Scotia's needs and provided oil and gas to all retail stations and bulk terminals in Nova Scotia. The refinery exported gasoline to the United States market and employed some 200 people.
