= Woodside, Nova Scotia =

Woodside
- Locality
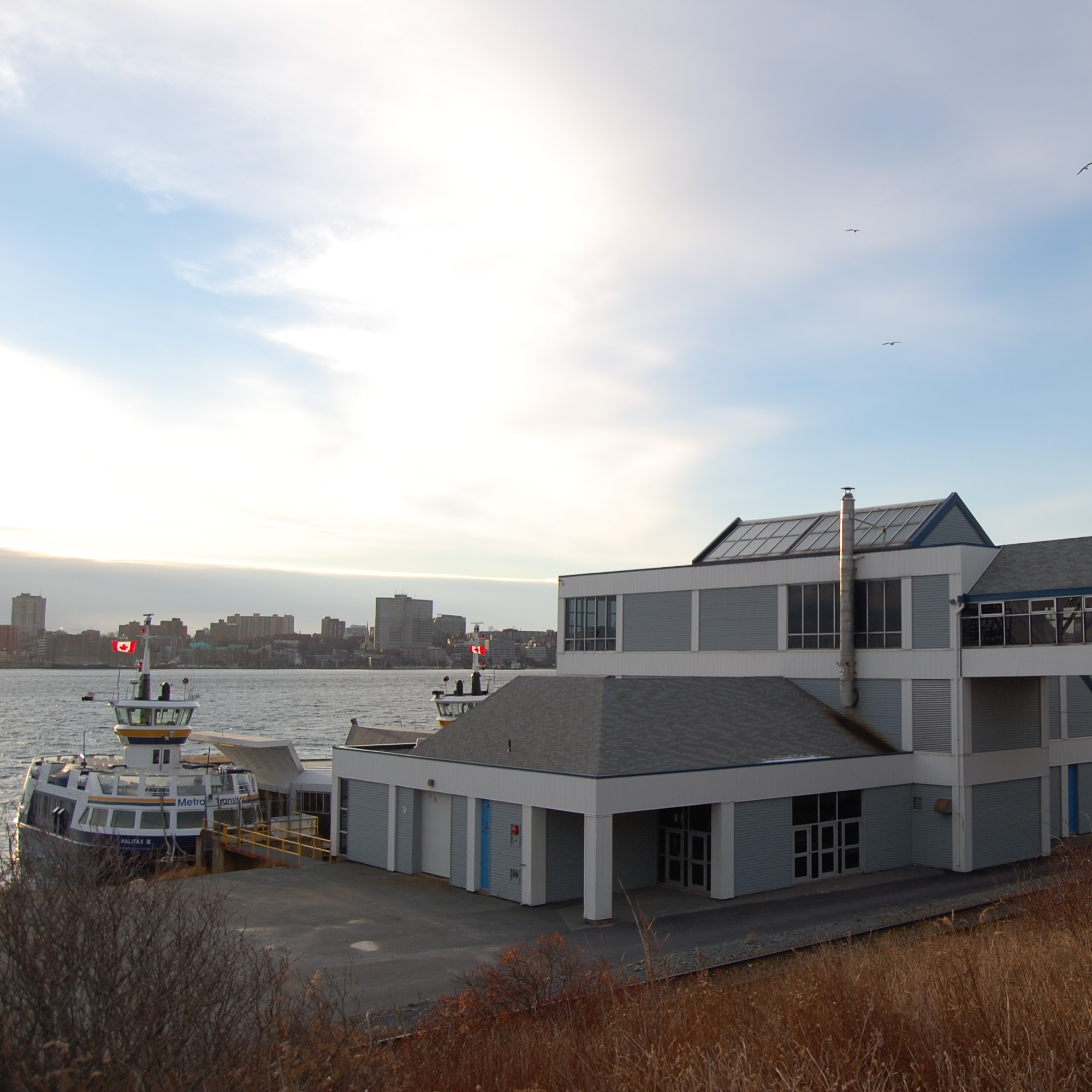
- Woodside ferry terminal on Halifax Harbour
- Interactive map of Woodside
- Location within Nova Scotia
- Coordinates: 44°38′46″N 63°32′20″W
- Country: Canada
- Province: Nova Scotia
- Municipality: Halifax Regional Municipality
- Community: Dartmouth
- Community council: Harbour East – Marine Drive Community Council
- District: 3 – Dartmouth South – Eastern Passage, 5 – Dartmouth Centre

Area
  - Total: 5.28 km^{2} (2.04 sq mi)
- Postal code: B2W-Y
- Area code: 902, 782
- GNBC code: CBPEJ

Woodside is an unincorporated middle income urban locality of Dartmouth, within the Halifax Regional Municipality, Nova Scotia. The community is divided into North Woodside and South Woodside. Woodside is home to two hospitals: the Dartmouth General Hospital and the Nova Scotia Hospital.

== History ==
Woodside originally referred to the rural estate of John E. Fairbanks in 1830. Around this time, Henry Mott ran a brickyard and a chocolate factory in the area. The area began to expand in 1858 with the construction of the Nova Scotia Hospital, and then again in 1884 following the construction of a sugar refinery. In 1917, the Imperial Oil Refinery was built, leading to further growth. In 1921, Immaculate Conception Roman Catholic Church and St. Alban's Anglican Church were built on hospital land. The following year, Woodside-Imperoyal Presbyterian Church was established. Because the local economy was driven by the refineries, Woodside was predominantly a working class community. There was at one point consideration to incorporate Woodside as a town, but the idea was rejected by the provincial government.

== Geography ==
Woodside is divided into two areas; North Woodside and South Woodside. North Woodside covers about 183 ha (450 acres), and South Woodside covers approximately 345 ha (850 acres). The total area of the community is 528 ha (1,300 acres).

== Schools ==
=== Current ===
- South Woodside Elementary School
- Dartmouth South Academy

=== Previous ===
- Southdale-North Woodside Elementary School
- Prince Arthur Junior High School

== Notable places ==
- Woodside Atlantic Wharf
- North Woodside Community Centre
- NSCC Ivany Campus
- Dartmouth Gate
