= IWK Health Centre =

Hospital in Halifax, Nova Scotia, Canada

- Location in Nova Scotia

Geography
- Location: 5850 University Avenue (pediatric); 5980 University Avenue (maternity), Halifax, Nova Scotia, Canada
- Coordinates: 44.637639°N 63.58425°W

Organization
- Care system: Public Medicare (Canada)
- Type: Teaching
- Affiliated university: Dalhousie University Faculty of Medicine

Services
- Emergency department: Tertiary trauma centre
- Speciality: Pediatric, maternity

Helipads
- Helipad: TC LID: CIW2

History
- Founded: 1909

Links
- Website: www.iwk.nshealth.ca
- Lists: Hospitals in Canada

IWK Health is a major women's and children's (pediatric) hospital and trauma centre in Halifax, Nova Scotia that provides care to maritime youth, children and women from Nova Scotia, New Brunswick, Prince Edward Island and beyond. The IWK is the largest facility in Atlantic Canada caring for children, youth, and adolescents and is the only Level 1 pediatric trauma centre east of Quebec.

== Location ==
The IWK Health main campus is located in the south end of Halifax. The front entrance is on University Avenue between Robie Street and Summer Street. The IWK emergency entrance is located on South Street.

As of 2024. the IWK is building a new emergency department building. The new entrance will be located on University Avenue and is expected to open by 2026.

IWK Health also manages more than 20 remote site locations distributed throughout the Halifax region and Nova Scotia.

== History ==
The present-day IWK Health traces its history to the development of two separate facilities, a pediatric hospital and a maternity hospital.

=== Pediatric hospital ===
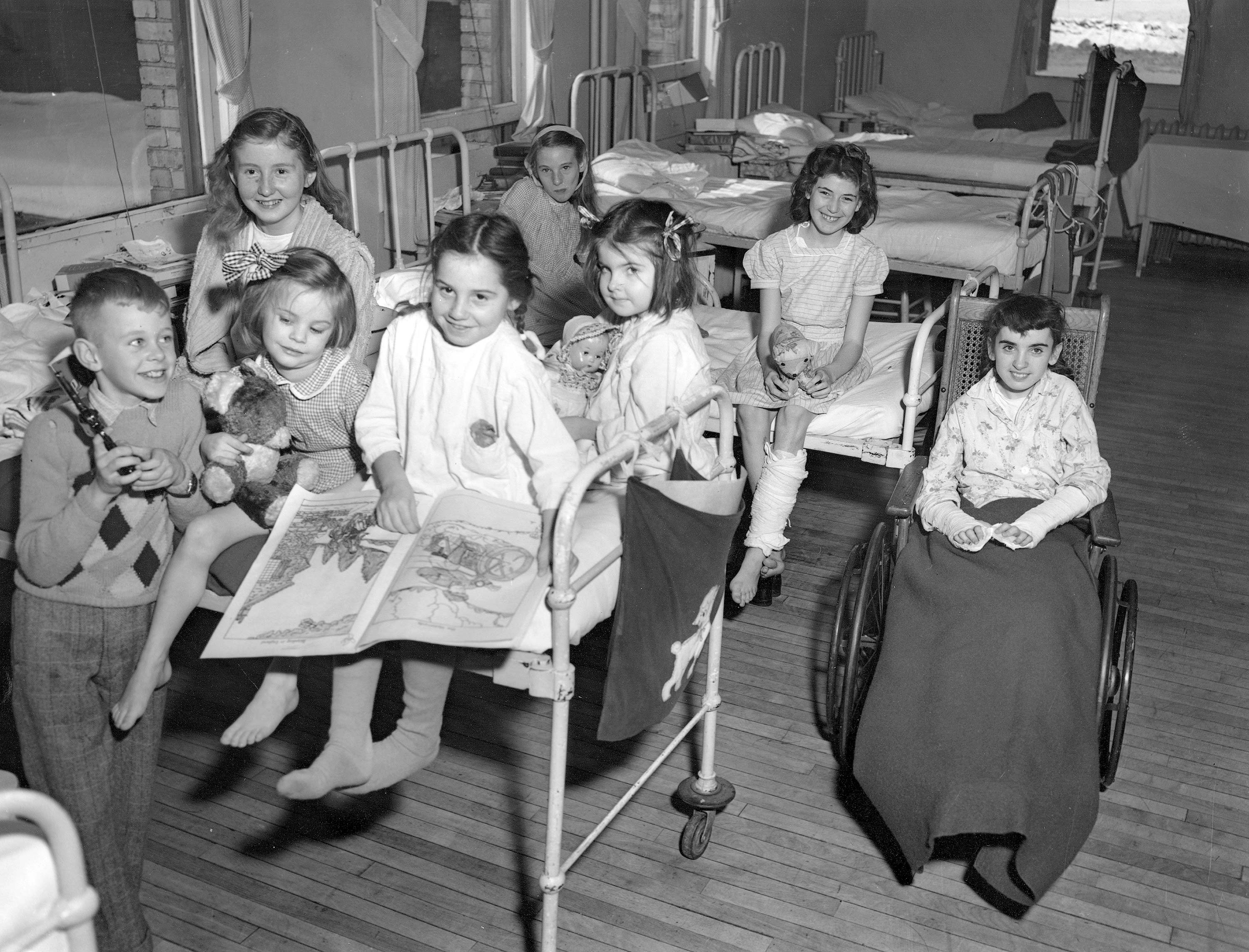
Group of young patients, 1948

In the early 20th century, a group of Halifax residents along with interested physicians proposed the idea of establishing a children's hospital in Halifax. A multi-year fundraising campaign ensued, raising $6,000 by 1907; later that year a donation of $10,000 by the late Mr. F.D. Corbett resulted in the beginning of construction of the Halifax Children's Hospital which opened for use in 1909. It was located on the east side of Robie Street on the block bounded by University Avenue and South Street. In 1922, the Grace Maternity Hospital would be built on the opposite (north) side of University Avenue. This early pediatric facility had no private beds and, since health care in Canada at that time was private, surgical and medical staff donated their services without charge. The building expanded in 1919 to increase bed capacity to 50, followed by a further expansion in 1931 to 90 beds, and finally 217 beds in 1955.

Mrs. Dorothy J. Killam donated $8 million toward construction of a new pediatric hospital in the memory of her late husband Izaak Walton Killam. Construction of the new Izaak Walton Killam Hospital for Children (informally nicknamed the IWK) began in 1967 and the $20 million 325-bed facility opened in 1970. The location chosen was immediately west and adjacent to the province's largest health care facility, the Victoria General Hospital, which was the teaching hospital associated with the Dalhousie University Faculty of Medicine. The IWK would continue the Halifax Children's Hospital's affiliation with the Faculty of Medicine's Department of Pediatrics. Upon the opening of the IWK in 1970, the historic Halifax Children's Hospital was demolished.

The Children's Hospital School of Nursing operated from 1916 until 1971, having trained and graduated 801 pediatric nurses over its existence.

=== Maternity hospital ===
In 1906, The Salvation Army purchased an old school in Halifax's South End as a haven for "fallen women". The facility was named Harrow House. Physicians there donated their time and the facility gained an excellent reputation for maternity care. The Halifax Explosion of December 6, 1917 gave momentum to the Halifax Medical Association's desire for a dedicated maternity institution, resulting in a resolution from that association on September 15, 1918, to Halifax City Council requesting funds for such a facility and that the Salvation Army be asked to run it. Dalhousie University offered the Salvation Army both land and funds to build and run the hospital.

The Grace Maternity Hospital (informally nicknamed the Grace) opened on April 29, 1922, as the only independent maternity hospital at that time in Canada; from the outset, the facility was affiliated as a teaching hospital with the Department of Pediatrics at Dalhousie University Faculty of Medicine. It was located on the east side of Robie Street on the block bounded by University Avenue and College Street; it was opposite the Halifax Children's Hospital which was located on the south side of University Avenue. The initial facility could accommodate 65 mothers and 65 babies. Major renovations to the facility took place in 1956, 1962, 1973 and 1977. In 1975 the Halifax Infirmary announced that it would no longer handle maternity cases, forcing the Grace to absorb its patients. By the 1970s the Grace occupied half a city block with 126 adult beds and 166 bassinets with 40 in the neo-natal intensive care unit (NICU).

According to the Halifax Mail Star of May 28, 1970, the children's hospital financed by the Killam Estate opened, despite the failed condition that the South Street Poor House be eliminated. Today, this hospital building is gone, with a larger provincially funded building built set much further back on the former Poor House property.

A Government of Nova Scotia proposal in the late 1970s to construct a new maternity facility for the Grace as part of the $120 million Camp Hill Medical Centre was postponed in 1982, forcing the Salvation Army to undertake an independent plan for a new Grace. By 1984, plans were underway to build a $30 million facility on the old site of the Halifax Children's Hospital which was adjacent to and immediately west of the Izaak Walton Killam Hospital for Children that had opened in 1970. The new Grace facility opened in 1992 bounding the block formed by University Avenue, Robie Street and South Street west of the IWK. The new 475,000 sq ft (44,100 m^{2}) building was connected to the IWK to provide access to that facility's pediatric medicine departments. It was designed by Nycum Fowler Group and DuBois Plumb Partnership and won the 1994 Lieutenant Governor's Award for Architecture. The old Grace Maternity Hospital located on the north side of the intersection of University Avenue and Robie Street was transferred to Dalhousie University and became home to the Faculty of Dentistry and the Faculty of Pharmacology.

The Grace Maternity School of Nursing opened in 1922 at the time the hospital itself opened, offering an 18-month course in Obstetrical and Newborn Nursing (these programs ended in 1959) and the school began a 3-year nursing program in affiliation with the Victoria General Hospital, Halifax Children's Hospital, Nova Scotia Sanatorium and Nova Scotia Hospital. The program ended in 1964, having trained and graduated almost 400 nurses over its existence.

=== 1995 merger to present ===
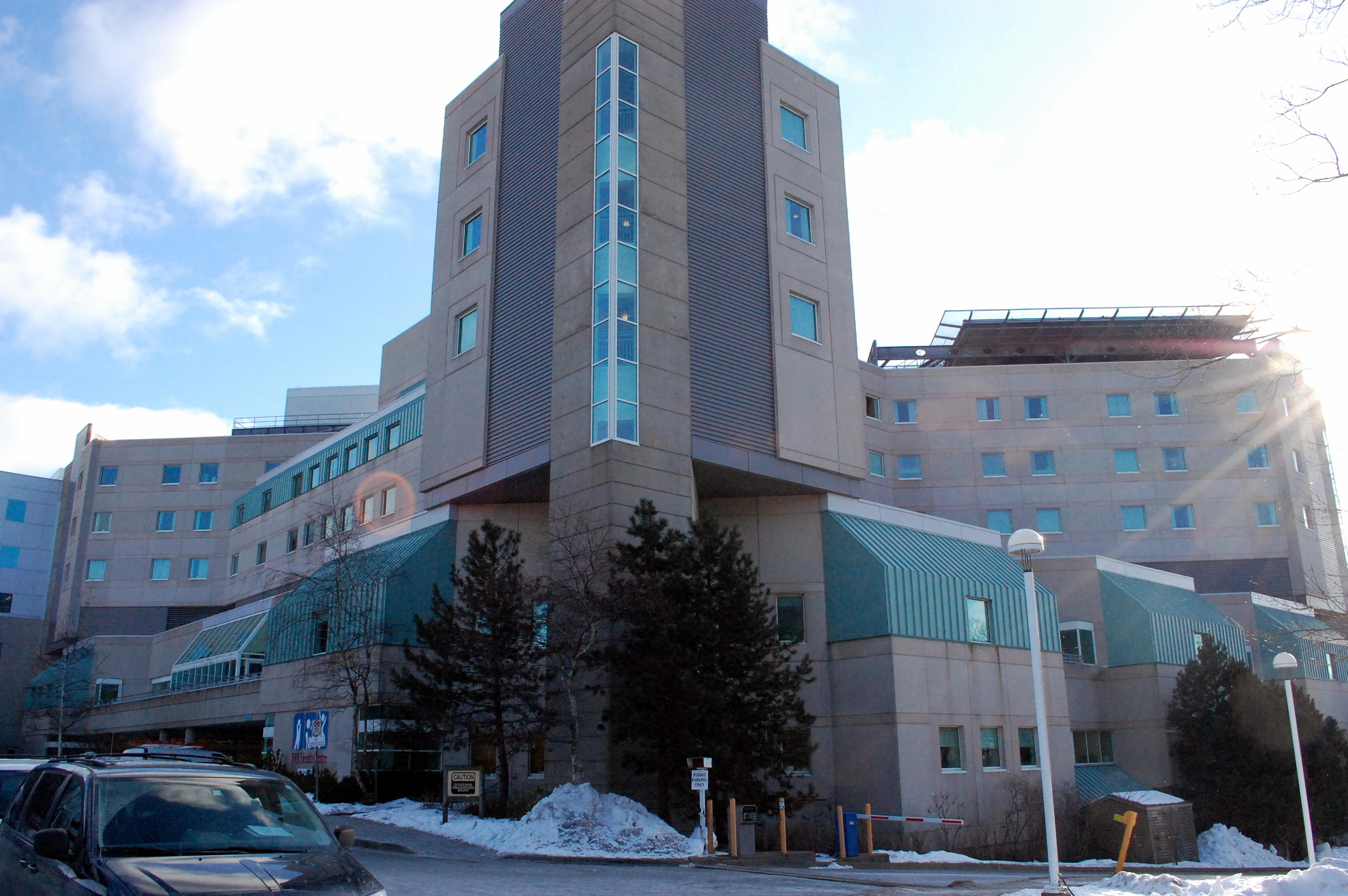
One wing of the hospital on a wintry day

In 1995, the Izaak Walton Killam Hospital for Children and the adjacent Grace Maternity Hospital merged to become the IWK Grace Hospital for Women, Children and Families. At that time a new "Link" building was constructed to join the separate buildings. In 2000 a helipad (TC LID: CIW2) was constructed on the southwest corner of the former Grace Maternity Hospital building; this proposal caused some concern in the adjacent residential area on the west side of Robie Street.

In 2001 the Salvation Army ended its involvement with the amalgamated institution and the name was simplified to become the IWK Health Centre which remains in current use as of 2013.

A 5-year $48 million redevelopment began in 2004 which resulted in the construction of 48,000 sq ft (4,500 m^{2}) of new space and renovations to 160,000 sq ft (15,000 m^{2}) of existing space. Inpatient units, perioperative facilities and ambulatory care space also saw major redevelopment. The most prominent exterior change to the facility was the addition of a parking garage accessed from University Avenue as well as an atrium connected to the Link Building. Today the IWK Health Centre terms the former Izaak Walton Killam Hospital for Children as the "Children's Site" and the former Grace Maternity Hospital building as the "Women's Site". Around 2006 two floors were added to the link building, which provided 48,000 sq ft (4,500 m^{2}) of additional space.

On June 24, 2013, philanthropist Marjorie Lindsay announced she would be donating $1 million to help fund the construction of a new inpatient mental health unit due to open in 2014. The Garron Centre for Child and Adolescent Mental Health opened for patients on May 14, 2014.

Additionally, on September 9, 2024, the IWK Foundation received a $25-million donation from Myron and Berna Garron, the largest donation the foundation has ever received and the single largest individual donation to health care in Atlantic Canada. Berna and Myron, responsible for the funding and support of the Garron Centre for Child and Adolescent, made the donation with a strong emphasis on supporting the completion of the Mental Health and Addictions Ecosystem. The money will go towards supporting a reimagined therapeutic environment for mental health and addiction services in Atlantic Canada.

== Education and research ==
The IWK is a teaching hospital and is affiliated with Dalhousie University. The hospital is also renowned as a research hospital in the areas of children's and women's health.

== Telethon ==
In 1985, CBC Television affiliates began airing the Children's Miracle Network telethon, simulcast on CBC New Brunswick (CHSJ 1985-1994, CBAT 1995) from 1985-1995. The Telethon aired at the IWK and the CBHT studios until 1995. The IWK logo changed in 1995, just in time for CBC's final telethon used the new logo IWK Grace telethon but hosted by Jim Nunn and Linda Kelly. In 1996, CTV Atlantic began airing the telethon. Various CBC stations stopped airing Children's Miracle Network telethons in 1995 except for CBNT-DT, which aired the telethon until 2011 for the Janeway Telethon. Steve Murphy has been hosting the telethon since 1996 on CTV Atlantic (formerly ATV) when CBC stopped airing the telethon in 1995. The original host was Don Tremaine (1985-1994). The new host is Todd Battis (same person appeared on CBC IWK Telethon). The CBC IWK Grace Telethon has also aired on CBCT-TV and CBIT until 1995 with final CBC Telethon and used same logo as the ATV Telethons where they debuted on June 1, 1996.

== Statistics ==
- Approximately 5,000 babies are delivered at the IWK Health Centre each year.
- There are more than 3,200 employees at the IWK Health Centre.
- Approximately 29,170 patient visits to the emergency department each year.
- Approximately 1,298,717 tests are completed in laboratories at the IWK Health Centre each year.
- Approximately $20 million of funded research was underway at the IWK Health Centre in 2010.
- As of 2010, the IWK Health Centre has 1,252 beds.

== See also ==
- List of hospitals in Canada
