= Dartmouth General Hospital =

- Nova Scotia Health Authority
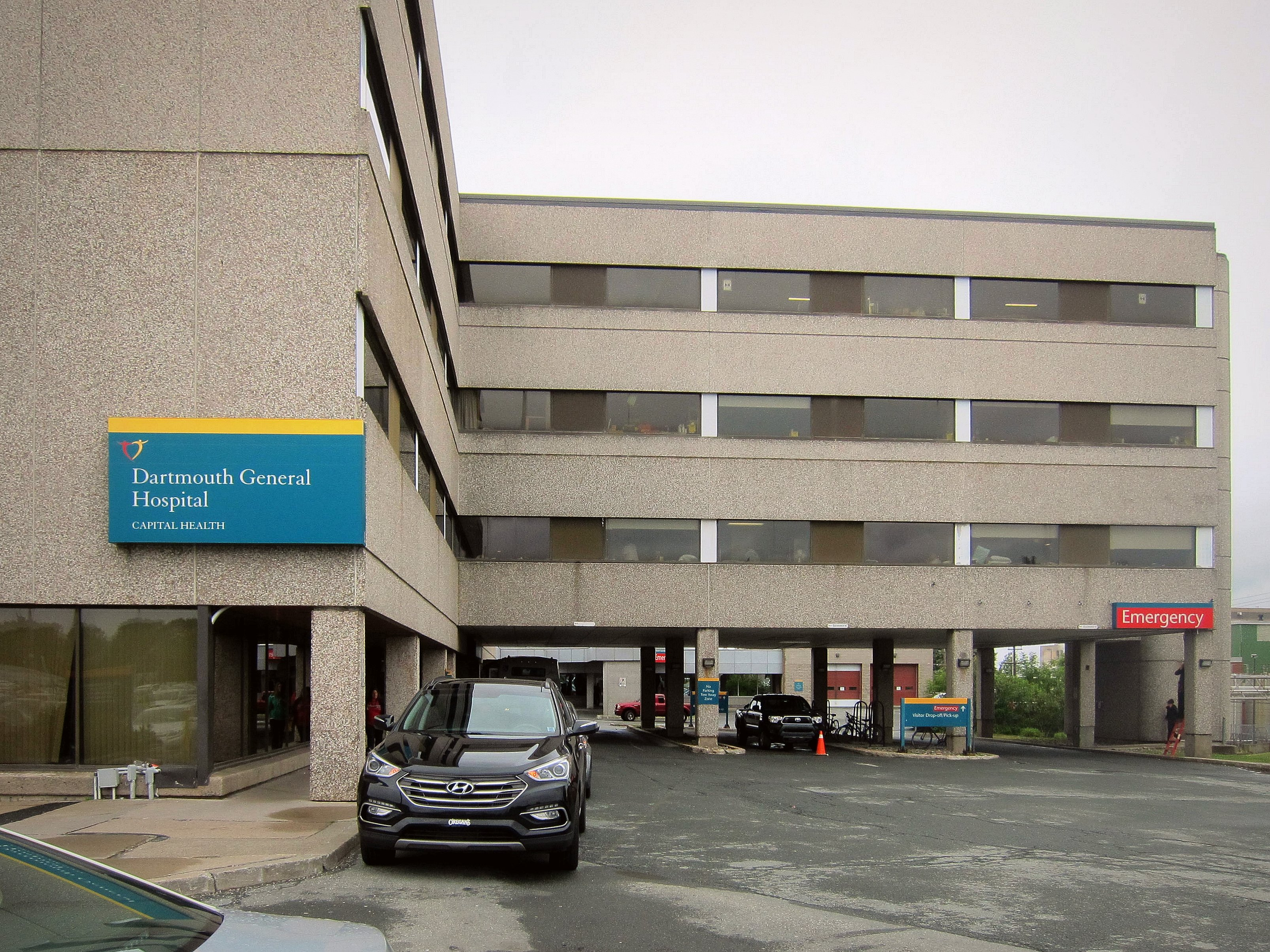
- Emergency department entrance

- Location in Nova Scotia

Geography
- Location: 325 Pleasant Street; Dartmouth, Nova Scotia
- Coordinates: 44.6538°N 63.5476°W

Organisation
- Care system: Public
- Type: Teaching
- Affiliated university: Faculty of Medicine, Dalhousie University

Services
- Emergency department: Yes

History
- Founded: 1976

The Dartmouth General Hospital is an acute care hospital in Dartmouth, Nova Scotia, Canada.

It is a 24-hour emergency, inpatient medical, surgical and critical care facility that has been operating since 1976. It serves approximately 120,000 people in Dartmouth and the eastern Halifax Regional Municipality. It is located on Pleasant Street (Route 322) across from the Nova Scotia Hospital. It is operated by the Nova Scotia Health Authority.

== History ==
The construction of the Dartmouth General Hospital was many decades in the making. On Natal Day in 1940, the town of Dartmouth launched fundraising efforts for a 50-bed hospital, which had reportedly been suggested 30 years earlier. A series of public meetings in 1942 were held in support of the project, and the Dartmouth Memorial Hospital Association continued to raise funds.

Throughout the 1960s, various studies and consultations were completed on the future Dartmouth hospital considering aspects such as architectural styles, care requirements, locations, bed capacities, and technologies. In 1968, two proposed locations for the hospital were adjacent to the Nova Scotia Hospital in Woodside, or the old Dartmouth city dump which was at the top of Woodland Avenue. Ultimately, the Woodside location was chosen due to the steam plant the Nova Scotia Hospital already had, in which the Dartmouth General Hospital would purchase steam on contract. The final design was set in 1974, which was a state-of-the-art expandable building that could support up to eight floors. The building was designed by Halifax architecture firm Fowler Bauld & Mitchell.

During the 1970 provincial election, Dartmouth South incumbent MLA I.W. Akerley was defeated by Scott MacNutt, who campaigned on the promise of building a "long overdue" general hospital in Dartmouth. After his election, MacNutt was appointed health minister. In late 1973, a sod-turning ceremony for the new hospital was held. It was officiated over by MacNutt, the newly elected mayor Eileen Stubbs, and tourism minister Glen M. Bagnell. The 109-bed hospital (since expanded) was estimated to cost $5.4 million, but ended up costing about $11 million. The province paid 80 per cent while the City of Dartmouth paid 20 per cent. The Nova Scotia Hospital steam plant required a capacity upgrade to meet the demands of the new hospital which was completed in 1976.

After the Dartmouth General Hospital opened in 1976, the old Dartmouth Emergency Hospital was shut down. The new hospital's emergency department began operations on July 7, 1976. The hospital was formally opened on January 14, 1977, by Nova Scotia premier Gerald Regan and Bagnell, who unveiled a memorial plaque in the building lobby. The first inpatient was admitted in March 1977. An intensive care unit was inaugurated in October 1979. Construction of a $5 million expansion to the hospital began in 1980. The expansion was completed in phases, with the first finishing in 1982 with the addition of three more operating rooms, totaling six, and more mechanical support equipment. The final phase was completed in 1986 which saw the addition of the other half to the fourth floor, a new dedicated intensive care unit, and the fifth floor. The fifth floor remained empty and unfinished until 2018.

In August 1996, the hospital treated the cast and crew of the award-winning Titanic film after an angry crew member laced a serving of lobster chowder with the hallucinogenic drug phencyclidine (PCP).

In 1999, the newly formed health district, Capital Health, gained control of the Dartmouth General and adjacent Nova Scotia Hospital. The two hospitals, although different in care missions, were subsequently merged in terms of budget and facility management. At the same time, construction of the new emergency department and day surgery commenced with construction completing in 2000. The former emergency department would be converted to outpatient clinics. The newly constructed day surgery department would not open until late 2004. In 2004, a new Renal Dialysis clinic was constructed, and opened in 2005.

In 2015, responsibility for the hospital was transferred from Capital Health to the newly formed Nova Scotia Health Authority or NSHA. In late 2015, an announcement by the NSHA was made stating the Dartmouth General would undergo a $132 million expansion which would see the finishing of the fifth floor, a new four floor wing, new front entrance, revamped diagnostic imaging department, renovated renal dialysis, and new intensive care unit. The expansion on the new wing broke ground in summer of 2017, with the vacant fifth floor starting construction in spring of 2018. The completion date for all renovations and expansions is to be late 2020 or early 2021. The expansion is a part of the NSHAs QEII Next Generation project that has the goal to replace the Victoria General Hospital by expanding on the Dartmouth General, the Halifax Infirmary, and the construction of an outpatients clinic.

The new expansion, named and dedicated to Neville J. Gilfoy, officially opened in December 2019. The addition features eight new operating rooms to replace the six original, a new day surgery department, new outpatient clinics, and a new sterile prep department.

== Services ==
- 24-hour emergency department
- CT scanning
- Ear, nose, and throat surgery
- Inpatient medical, surgical, and critical care
- General radiography
- General surgery
- Gynaecology
- Laboratory services
- Mammography
- Oral maxillofacial surgery
- Orthopaedic surgery
- Outpatient services
- Plastic surgery
- Renal dialysis
- Urology
