= Dalhousie University Faculty of Medicine =

Public medical school in Halifax, Canada

Coordinates: 44.63898°N 63.58366°W

Dalhousie Faculty of Medicine
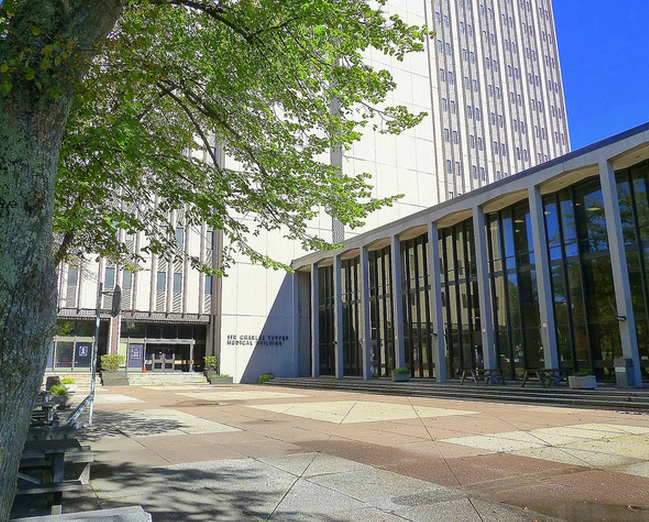
- Dalhousie Medical School campus
- Established: 1868; 158 years ago (School of Medicine)
- Affiliations: Dalhousie University
- Dean: Dr. David Anderson
- Students: 108 per year
- Location: Halifax, Nova Scotia, Canada
- Website: medicine.dal.ca

The Faculty of Medicine at Dalhousie University, also known as Dalhousie Medical School, is a medical school and faculty of Dalhousie University in Halifax, Nova Scotia, Canada.

The Faculty of Medicine has operated continuously since 1868 and is one of the oldest medical schools in Canada, after Laval, McGill, and Queen's.

The Faculty of Medicine currently teaches the MD degree at two campuses:

- Sir Charles Tupper Medical Building, Carleton Campus (Halifax, NS)
- Saint John Regional Hospital (Saint John, NB)

Dalhousie's postgraduate medical faculty offers 53 residency programs at teaching hospitals located across Nova Scotia, New Brunswick and Prince Edward Island.

== History ==
The Faculty of Medicine was founded in 1868. It graduated its first woman in 1894. The school's main teaching location is the Sir Charles Tupper Medical Building which is a 15-story high-rise building that opened in 1965 on Dalhousie University's Carleton Campus. The first woman to be appointed Dean was Noni MacDonald in 1999. Today, the Tupper Medical Building houses the administrative offices of the Faculty of Medicine and the Faculty of Health Sciences, as well as the Kellogg Health Sciences Library, lecture theatres, a large cadaveric anatomy laboratory, and most of the basic science laboratories in the Faculty of Medicine. It adjoins the CRC, the Clinical Research Centre, via "The Tupper Link" corridor, which is the location of many state-of-the-art lecture halls equipped with teleconferencing technology. The CRC houses the Dean of Medicine's office as well as affiliated administrative offices.

The Faculty of Medicine is the only medical school based in the Maritime Provinces and as such is closely affiliated with the healthcare systems operated by the Government of Nova Scotia, the Government of New Brunswick and the Government of Prince Edward Island. This region has a combined population of 1.8 million people with teaching hospitals located in various locations across the three provinces, as well as the Queen Elizabeth II Health Sciences Centre and IWK Health Centre (in Halifax) and the Saint John Regional Hospital in the immediate vicinity of the medical school's 2 campuses. There is currently a medical programme offered in French operated by the Universite de Sherbrooke located at the Universite de Moncton. In addition, the Memorial University of Newfoundland (which has its own Faculty of Medicine) will jointly run a faculty of medicine in Charlottetown with the University of Prince Edward Island.

Dalhousie University has developed a reputation for inadequately managed bullying, discrimination, and a toxic workplace culture within the medical realm, due to a history of several medical professional misconduct scandals in Nova Scotia.

== Curriculum ==
The Doctor of Medicine program admits 108 students per year. Of these, 78 matriculants attend the Halifax Campus and 30 attend the New Brunswick campus in Saint John, New Brunswick. In 2010, the average undergraduate GPA of accepted applicants was 3.8, and 24 percent of the entering class held graduate degrees.

Dalhousie awards the MD degree to students completing "the Tupper Trail," a new curriculum developed by the Faculty of Medicine. This program incorporates early exposure to clinical skills and clinical electives from Year 1, as well as collaboration projects with students in other health professions.

In 2010, it was reported that Dalhousie medical students placed first in Canada on the Medical Council of Canada Qualifying Examination, the school-leaving exam written by all Canadian MD candidates.

== Affiliated teaching hospitals ==
- Queen Elizabeth II Health Sciences Centre (Halifax, NS)
- IWK Health Centre (Halifax, NS)
- Nova Scotia Hospital (Dartmouth, NS)
- Saint John Regional Hospital (Saint John, NB)
- Moncton Hospital (Moncton, NB)
- Dr.Everett Chalmers Hospital (Fredericton, NB)
- Queen Elizabeth Hospital (Charlottetown, PEI)
- Dartmouth General Hospital (Dartmouth, NS)
- Cape Breton Regional Hospital (Sydney, NS)
- Colchester Regional Hospital (Truro, NS)
- South Shore Regional Hospital (Bridgewater, NS)
- Valley Regional Hospital (Kentville, NS)
- Cobequid Community Health Centre (Lower Sackville, NS)
- Hants Community Hospital (Windsor, NS)

== Notable faculty and alumni ==
- J. Howard Crocker – Canadian educator for the YMCA and University of Western Ontario, and sports executive with the Amateur Athletic Union of Canada and the Canadian Olympic Committee
- Annie Isabella Hamilton (1866-1941), the first woman in Nova Scotia to receive an M.D.
- Jock Murray (MD'63), neurologist and medical historian in the history of neurology
- Shane Neilson (born 1975), Canadian physician and poet
- Ron Stewart (MD'70), Former Nova Scotian Minister of Health (1990), and a pioneer of the specialty of Emergency Medicine.
- Ban Tsui, Professor of Anesthesiology at University of Alberta, pioneered the Tsui Test
- Sir Charles Tupper (1821–1915), dean of Dalhousie Medical School, prime minister of Canada in 1896, first president of the Canadian Medical Association
- Alfred Waddell (MD'33), Trinidadian physician and civil rights activist

== See also ==
- Higher education in Nova Scotia
