= Nova Scotia Hospital =

Hospital in Dartmouth, Nova Scotia, Canada

- Nova Scotia Health Authority
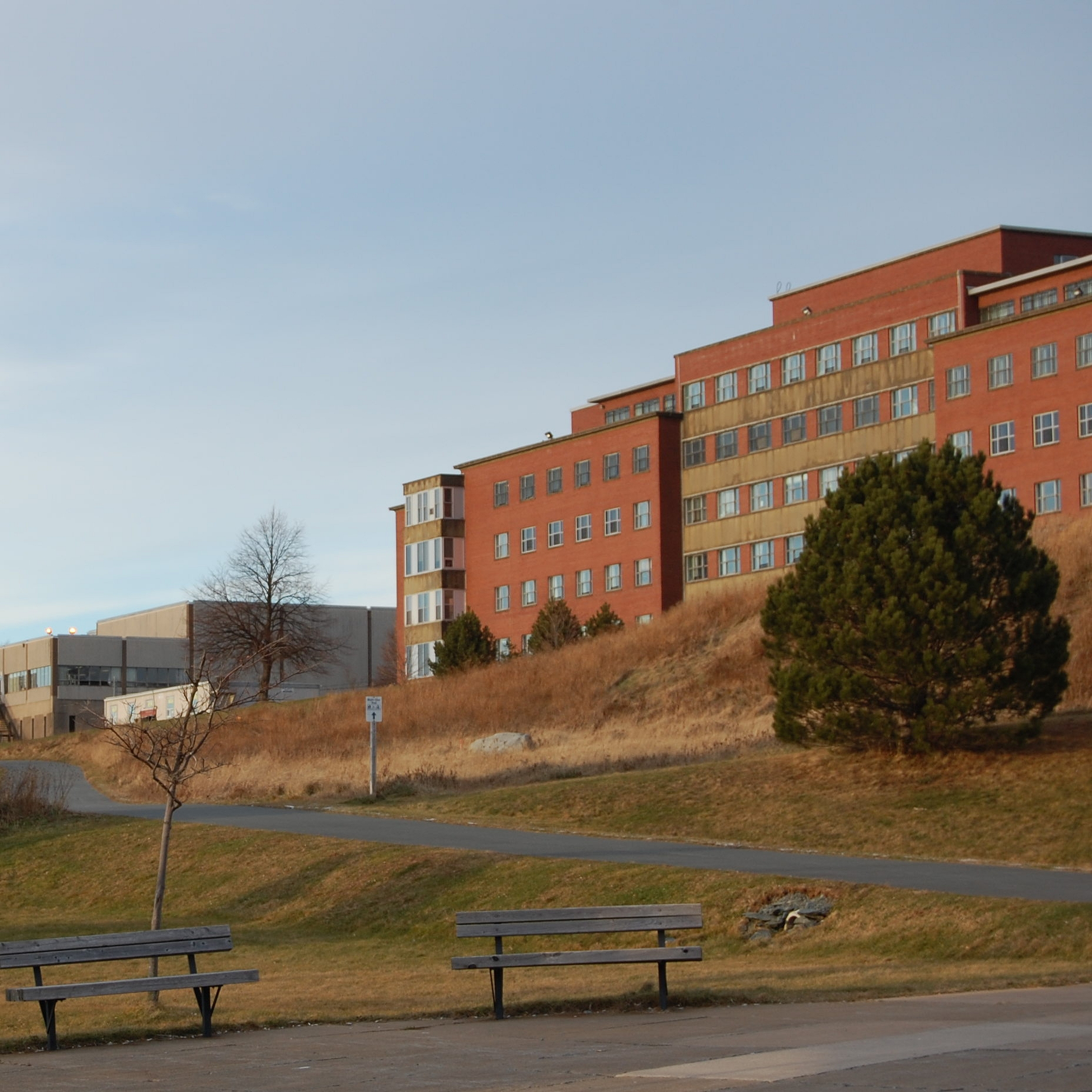

- Location in Nova Scotia

Geography
- Location: 300 Pleasant Street, Dartmouth, Nova Scotia, Canada
- Coordinates: 44.6517°N 63.5495°W

Organization
- Care system: Public Medicare (Canada)
- Type: Teaching
- Affiliated university: Dalhousie University Faculty of Medicine

Services
- Beds: 116
- Speciality: Psychiatric

History
- Founded: 1852

Links
- Website: Nova Scotia Hospital
- Lists: Hospitals in Canada

The Nova Scotia Hospital, known locally as The NS or Mount Hope, is a psychiatric hospital in Dartmouth, Nova Scotia. Operated by the Nova Scotia Health Authority, it is the province's largest and oldest mental health facility. Co-founded by the Hon. Hugh Bell and Dorothea Dix, it opened in 1856 as the Mount Hope Asylum for the Insane and today it is a fully accredited teaching facility affiliated with Dalhousie University.

Since its founding in 1852, the Nova Scotia Hospital has a rich and long history. It supported patients during World War I and II, and the Halifax Explosion. It has undergone expansion and constant improvement with the addition of buildings which support adolescent, adult, and geriatric patient care ranging from day programs, outpatient, short-term stay, and long-term stay.

The former Nova Scotia Hospital Foundation is now the Mental Health Foundation of Nova Scotia.

== See also ==
- Dartmouth General Hospital – located on the opposite side of Pleasant Street
