= Memorial University of Newfoundland Faculty of Medicine =

Canadian medical school

Coordinates: 47°34′20.92″N 52°44′29.78″W

Faculty of Medicine Memorial University of Newfoundland
- Type: Public
- Established: 1967; 59 years ago
- Affiliations: Memorial University of Newfoundland
- Location: St. John's, Newfoundland and Labrador, Canada
- Website: www.med.mun.ca

Faculty of Medicine of Memorial University of Newfoundland is located on the eastern edge of North America and is one of two medical schools in Atlantic Canada. It was founded in 1967 and is the academic core of health research in the province.

The Faculty of Medicine includes the medical school, postgraduate residency training programs and graduate programs leading to a Masters, Doctoral or MD-PhD degree or to diplomas in Community Health, Clinical Epidemiology and Post-Secondary Studies (Health Professional Education). It is located in adjacent to the Health Sciences Centre on the northwest corner of the St. John's campus of Memorial University of Newfoundland, as well as many smaller sites in urban and rural areas throughout Newfoundland and Labrador and Atlantic Canada.

== History ==
In 1966, Lord Russell Brain completed a Royal Commission on Health, which advised that a medical school was crucial for health care in the province of Newfoundland and Labrador. Several other reports ensued, all supporting the necessity of a medical school. The federal government's Health Resources Fund was also essential to the realization of a medical school for this province. In 1967, Premier Joseph R. Smallwood committed the government to a formal financial commitment.

On Sept. 1, 1967, after an international search in Canada, England and the United States, the Faculty of Medicine became a reality with the appointment of Ian Rusted as the first dean of medicine.

That same year, the university announced K. B. Roberts, born in London, England, as associate dean of medicine, a position that became effective full-time in 1968. Both Rusted and Roberts traveled throughout Canada and the United States examining the setup of various medical schools in order to design the most appropriate model for Memorial University and the General Hospital.

The university announced two more appointments in the Faculty of Medicine in February 1968, and they too were heavily involved with the development of the school. William Marshall, born in London, England, but now living in New York, was appointed associate professor of immunology and director of Postgraduate Medical Education, effective June 1, 1968. A. M. House, professor of neurology and chief of staff at the St. John's General Hospital, was appointed director of Continuing Medical Education (CME). All four doctors tackled the job of further faculty recruitment.

The first class graduated from Memorial's Faculty of Medicine in 1973. Sharon Peters was a member of the second graduating class from Memorial's Faculty of Medicine who went on to become the first clinical chief of critical care, and later became a professor.

The University is presently developing a Faculty of Medicine, in association with the University of Prince Edward Island.

== Programs ==
Memorial's Faculty of Medicine is accredited by the Committee on Accreditation of Canadian Medical Schools (CACMS) of the Association of Faculties of Medicine of Canada (AFMC) and the Liaison Committee on Medical Education (LCME) of the Association of American Medical Colleges (AAMC).

The Faculty of Medicine has 320 medical students and 250 postgraduate residents from all socio-economic backgrounds; nearly half come from rural areas. The faculty recently won the Keith Award for the seventh time for having the largest number of graduates practicing in a rural area 10 years after graduation. Memorial's average between 2007 and 2017 was 45 per cent compared to the national average of 22 per cent.

The four-year undergraduate medical program provides a comprehensive and integrated medical education. Teaching methods are diverse, but there is an emphasis on small group teaching. The size of the faculty and the student body facilitate a personalized learning environment. An integrated approach to the field of medicine is encouraged by a non-departmental administration system based on three divisions: Community Health and Humanities, BioMedical Sciences and the Clinical Sciences.

The faculty's curriculum places particular emphasis on community and rural medicine learning environments, and patient contact starts early in a medical student's training. Memorial's medical graduates are sought after across Canada and in the U.S. and are recognized for their clinical maturity and good grounding in the basics. The faculty excels in clinical teaching, and has research expertise in specific areas of clinical specialties, community health, epidemiology, applied health and services research, and basic medical science including neurosciences, immunology, cardiovascular & renal physiology and human genetic research.

Graduate programs include a wide range of programs and disciplines, including M.Sc., MPH, MHE, PhD and assorted diplomas in graduate fields.
