= Frank Wesbrook =

Frank Fairchild Wesbrook
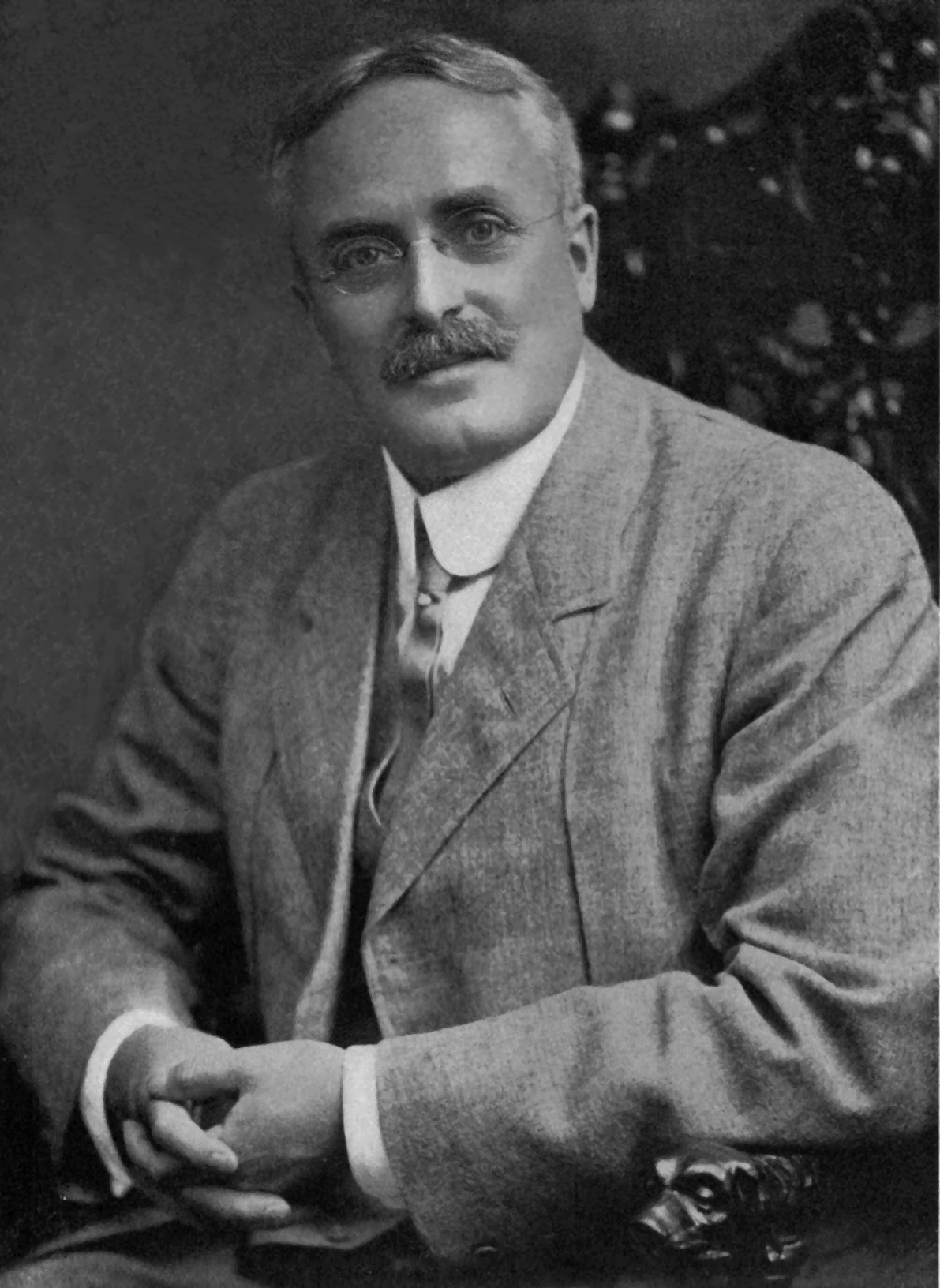

1st President of the University of British Columbia
- In office 1913–1918
- Succeeded by: Leonard Klinck

Personal details
- Born: July 12, 1868 Oakland, Ontario, Canada
- Died: October 20, 1918 (aged 50) Vancouver, British Columbia, Canada
- Spouse: Ann Wesbrook
- Children: Helen

Frank Fairchild Wesbrook (July 12, 1868 – October 20, 1918) was a Canadian physician, bacteriologist, academic, and University president. He was the first president of the University of British Columbia.

== Biography ==
Born in Oakland, Ontario, Wesbrook received a bachelor's and master's degree from the University of Manitoba in 1887 and 1888. He received his M.D. and C.M. degrees from the University of Manitoba and McGill College. From 1891 to 1893, he was a Professor of Pathology at the University of Manitoba. From 1893 to 1895, he studied pathology at Cambridge University.

In 1895, he was appointed director of the Department of Pathology, Bacteriology and Hygiene at the University of Minnesota. His chief work was in Bacteriology relating to public health. He helped in diphtheria research and was in favour of chlorine sterilization of water. He was also a Director of the Minnesota Board of Health Laboratories and was a member of the Minnesota State Board of Health.

In 1906, he was appointed Dean of the University of Minnesota Medical School. In 1913, he was appointed the first president of the University of British Columbia. He served until his death in 1918.

== Legacy ==
The Wesbrook Building, Wesbrook Mall, and Wesbrook Village at UBC are named after him.
