= University of British Columbia =

Public university in Canada

- Coat of arms
- Latin: Universitas Columbiae Britannicae
- Motto: Tuum Est (Latin)
- Motto in English: "It is up to you" "It is yours"
- Type: Public research university
- Established: 1908; 118 years ago
- Academic affiliations: ACU; APRU; ASAIHL; Universities Canada; U15
- Endowment: CA$3.0 billion (2024)
- Budget: CA$3.8 billion (2024)
- Chancellor: Judy Rogers
- President: Benoit-Antoine Bacon
- Provost: Gage Averill (Vancouver) and Rehan Sadiq (Okanagan)
- Academic staff: 5,696 (Vancouver); 600 (Okanagan)
- Administrative staff: 10,647 (Vancouver); 835 (Okanagan)
- Students: 53,481 (2024–25 FTE)
- Undergraduates: 44,882 (Vancouver); 8,990 (Okanagan) (Note: Includes education, dentistry, law and medicine post-baccalaureate programs.)
- Postgraduates: 9,981 (Vancouver); 945 (Okanagan)
- Location: Metro Vancouver, British Columbia, Canada: UBC Point Grey; UBC Robson Square; UBC–VGH Medical Campus; UBC–BC Children's Hospital Research Institute; UBC–Great Northern Way; Kelowna, British Columbia, Canada: UBC Okanagan; UBC Innovation Library; UBC-KGH Clinical Academic Campus; 49°15′53″N 123°15′10″W
- Campus: Vancouver: 4.020 km^{2} (993 acres) Okanagan: 2.086 km^{2} (515 acres)
- Language: English
- Newspaper: The Ubyssey (Vancouver); The Phoenix News (Okanagan)
- Colours: UBC Blue and gold
- Nicknames: Thunderbirds (Vancouver); Heat (Okanagan)
- Sporting affiliations: NAIA, U Sports, CWUAA
- Website: ubc.ca

The University of British Columbia (UBC) is a public research university with two main campuses near Vancouver and Kelowna, in British Columbia, Canada. With an annual research budget of $893 million, UBC funds 9,992 projects annually in various fields of study within the industrial sector, as well as governmental and non-governmental organizations.

The Vancouver campus is situated on Point Grey campus lands, an unincorporated area bordering the University Endowment Lands in proximity to the City of Vancouver. The university is located 10 km (6 mi) west of Downtown Vancouver. UBC is also home to TRIUMF, Canada's national particle and nuclear physics laboratory, which boasts the world's largest cyclotron. In addition to the Stewart Blusson Quantum Matter Institute, UBC and the Max Planck Society collectively established the first Max Planck Institute in North America, specializing in quantum mechanics. Green College is UBC's transdisciplinary semi-independent post-graduate live-in college and is situated on the north-eastern tip of campus adjacent to Burrard Inlet. One of Canada's largest research libraries, the UBC Library system has over 8.3 million items (including print and electronic) among its 21 branches. It is visited annually by 3.1 million people or 9.7 million virtually. The Okanagan campus, acquired in 2005, is located in Kelowna, British Columbia.

Those affiliated with UBC include eight Nobel laureates, 75 Rhodes scholars, 231 Olympians with 65 medals won collectively, 306 fellows to the Royal Society of Canada, and 22 3M National Teaching Fellows. Among UBC's alums are Canadian Prime Ministers John Turner, Kim Campbell, Justin Trudeau, and the former prime minister of Bulgaria, Kiril Petkov.

== History ==
=== Foundation and early years ===
The University shall... provide for Such instruction in all branches of liberal education as may enable students to become proficient in... science, commerce, arts, literature, law, medicine, and all other branches of knowledge

— An Act to Establish and Incorporate a University for the Province of British Columbia, Acts of 1908, Chapter 53

In 1877, six years after British Columbia joined Canada, the Superintendent of Education, John Jessop, submitted a proposal to form a provincial university. The provincial legislature passed An Act Respecting the University of British Columbia in 1890, but disagreements arose over whether to build the university on Vancouver Island or the mainland.

The British Columbia University Act of 1908 formally called a provincial university into being, although its location was not specified. The governance was modelled on the Provincial University of Toronto Act of 1906, which created a bicameral system of university government consisting of a senate (faculty) responsible for academic policy and a board of governors (citizens) exercising exclusive control over financial policy and having formal authority in all other matters. The president, appointed by the board, was to provide a link between the two bodies and to perform institutional leadership. The Act constituted a 21-member senate with Francis Carter-Cotton of Vancouver as chancellor.

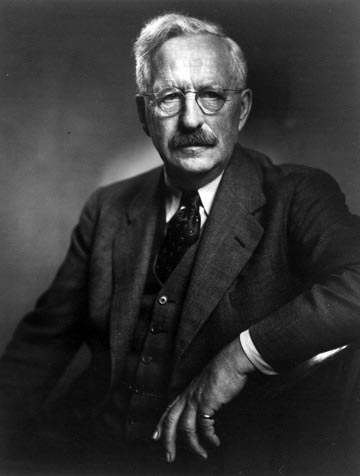
Henry Marshall Tory set up the college in 1906

Before the University Act, there were several attempts at creating a degree-granting university with help from the universities of Toronto and McGill. Columbia College in New Westminster, through its affiliation with Victoria College of the University of Toronto, began to offer university-level credit at the turn of the century, but McGill came to dominate higher education in the early 1900s.

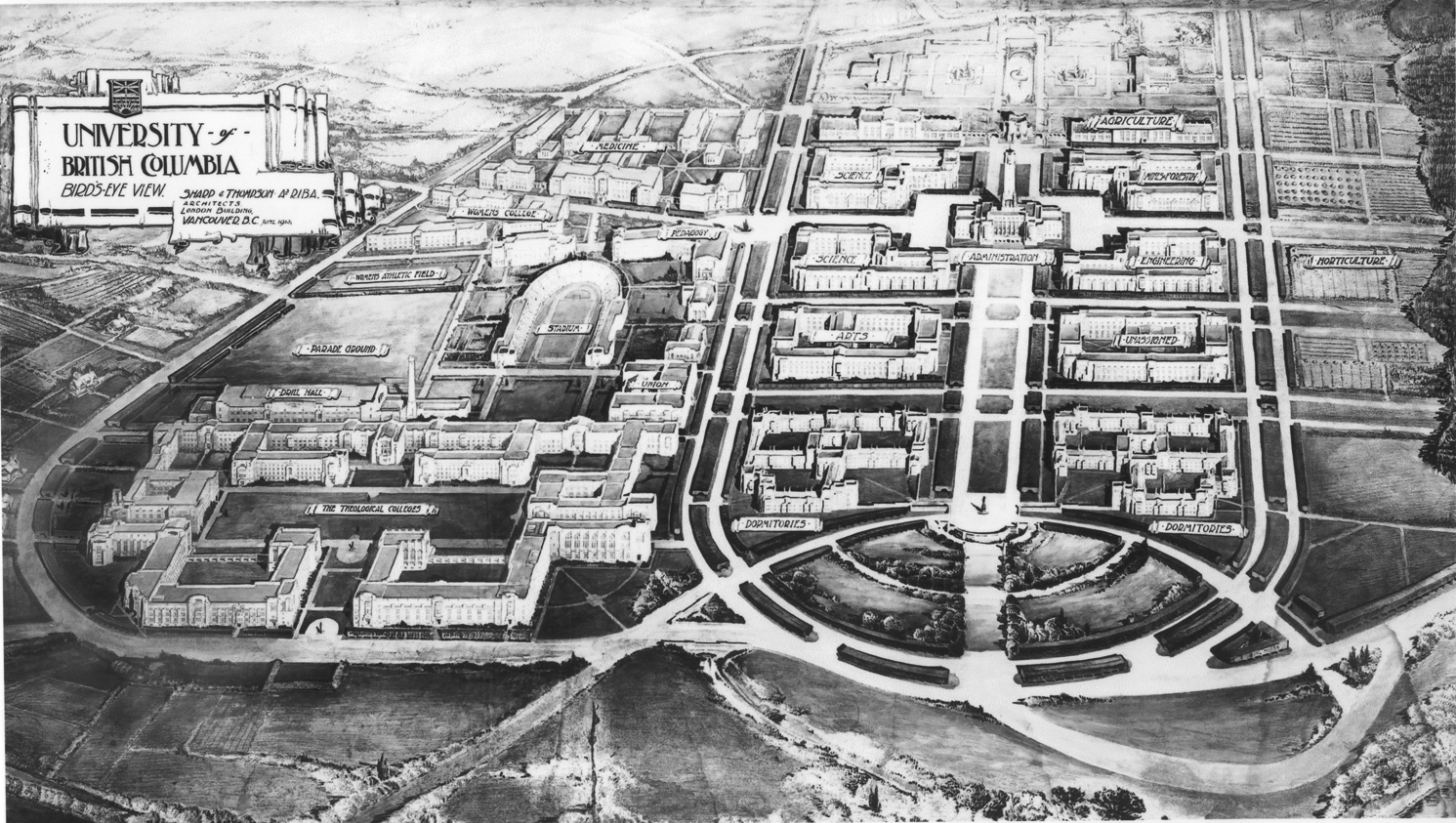
Original 1914 plan of the UBC campus, by architects Sharp and Thompson

Building on a successful affiliation between Vancouver and Victoria high schools with McGill University, Henry Marshall Tory helped establish the McGill University College of British Columbia. From 1906 to 1915, McGill BC (as it was called) operated as a private institution, providing the first few years toward a degree at McGill University or elsewhere. The Henry Marshall Tory Medal was established in 1941.

In the meantime, appeals were made to the government to revive the earlier legislation for a provincial institution, leading to the University Endowment Act in 1907 and the University Act in 1908. In 1910, the Point Grey site was chosen, and the government appointed Dr. Frank Fairchild Wesbrook as president in 1913 and Leonard Klinck as dean of agriculture in 1914. A declining economy and the outbreak of war in August 1914 compelled the university to postpone plans for building at Point Grey, and instead the former McGill University College site at Fairview became home to the university until 1925. On the first day of lectures, September 30, 1915, the new independent university absorbed McGill University College. The University of British Columbia awarded its first degrees on May 4, 1916, and Klinck became the second president in 1919, serving until 1944.

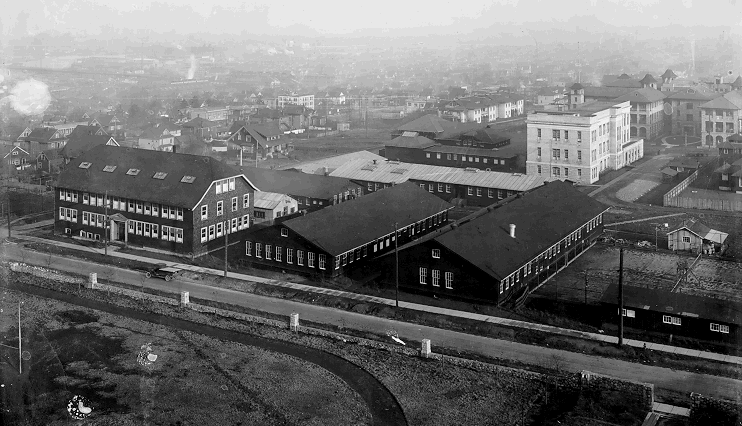
View of the UBC Fairview campus from the roof of King Edward High School (c. 1917) (Vancouver, British Columbia) (photo by Canadian Photo Co.)

In 1917, Evlyn Fenwick Farris became the first woman in Canada to be appointed to the board of governors of a university— a founding governor of UBC. She was also the first woman to be appointed to the UBC Senate. Active in its formation, the University Women's Club of Vancouver considered UBC its "godchild".

=== Move to Point Grey ===
World War I dominated campus life and the student body was "decimated" by enlistments for active service, with three hundred male UBC students in Company "D" alone. By the war's end, 697 male members of the university had enlisted. 109 students graduated in the three war-time congregations, all but one in the Faculty of Arts and Science.

By 1920, the university had only three faculties: Arts, Applied Science, and Agriculture (with the Departments of Agronomy, Animal Husbandry, Dairying, Horticulture, and Poultry). It only awarded the degrees of Bachelor of Arts (BA), Bachelor of Applied Science (BASc) and Bachelor of Science in agriculture (BSA). There were 576 male students and 386 female students in the 1920–21 winter session, but only 64 academic staff, including 6 women.

In the early part of the 20th century, professional education expanded beyond the traditional fields of theology, law, and medicine. Although UBC did not offer degrees in these fields, it began to offer degrees in new professional areas such as engineering, agriculture, nursing, and school teaching. It also introduced graduate training based on the German-inspired American model of specialized course work and the completion of a research thesis, with students completing M.A. degrees in natural sciences, social sciences, and humanities.

By 1922, the student body numbered over 1200 and embarked on a "Build the University" campaign. Students marched through the streets of Vancouver to draw attention to their plight, enlist popular support, and embarrass the government in what is now known as "The Great Trek". Fifty-six thousand signatures were presented at the legislature in support of the campaign, which was ultimately successful. On September 22, 1925, lectures began at the new Point Grey campus. Except for the library, science, and Power House buildings, all the campus buildings were temporary buildings. Students built two playing fields, but the university had no dormitories and no social centre. However, the university continued to grow.

Soon, however, the effects of the depression began to be felt. The provincial government, upon which the university depended heavily, cut the annual grant severely. In 1932–33, salaries were cut by up to 23%. Posts remained vacant, and a few faculty lost their jobs. Most graduate courses were dropped. In 1935, the university established the Department of Extension. Just as things began to improve, World War II began, and Canada declared war on September 10, 1939. Soon afterwards, University President Klinck wrote:

' From the day of the declaration of war, the University has been prepared to put at the disposal of the Government all possible assistance by way of laboratories, equipment and trained personnel, insofar as such action is consistent with the maintenance of reasonably efficient instructional standards. To do less would be unthinkable. '

Heavy rains and melting snowfall eroded a deep ravine across the north end of the campus, in the Grand Campus Washout of 1935. The campus did not have storm drains and surface runoff went down a ravine to the beach. When the university carved a ditch to drain flooding on University Avenue, the rush of water steepened the ravine and eroded it back as fast as 10 feet (3.0 m) per hour. The resulting gully eventually consumed 100,000 cubic yards (76,455 m^{3}), two bridges and buildings near Graham House. The university was closed for four and a half days. Afterwards, the gully was filled with debris from a nearby landslide, and only traces are visible today.

Military training on the campus became popular and was later made mandatory. WWII marked the first provision of money from the federal government to the university for research purposes. This laid a foundation for future research grants from the federal government of Canada.

=== Post-war years ===
By the end of World War II, Point Grey's facilities could not meet the influx of veterans returning to their studies. The university needed new staff, courses, faculties, and buildings for teaching and accommodation. The student population rose from 2,974 in 1944–45 to 9,374 in 1947–48. Surplus Army and Air Force camps were used for both classrooms and accommodations. The university took over fifteen complete camps during the 1945–46 session, with a sixteenth camp on Little Mountain, in Vancouver, converted into suites for married students. Most of the camps were dismantled and carried by barge or truck to the university, where the huts were scattered across the campus.

Student numbers hit 9,374 in 1948; more than 53% of the students were war veterans in 1947–67. Between 1947 and 1951, the university built twenty new permanent buildings. Those included the War Memorial Gym, which was built with money raised primarily by the students and dedicated on October 26, 1951. The first student residence on UBC campus, Robson House, opened in 1959.

In the 1961–62 academic year, the university had an enrolment of 12,602 students, including 798 graduate students. The next year, the single-University policy in the West was changed as existing colleges of the provincial universities gained autonomy as Universities – the University of Victoria was established in 1963.

=== Recent history ===
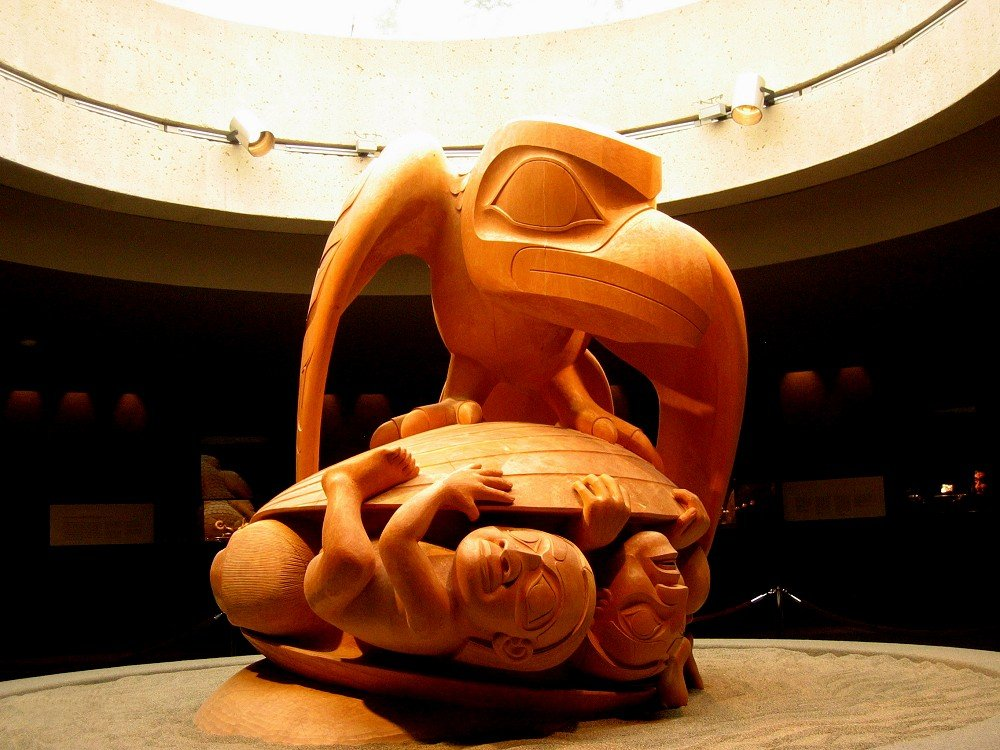
Bill Reid's Raven and the First Men at the UBC Museum of Anthropology

Prime Minister Pierre Trudeau announced the creation of the Museum of Anthropology at UBC on July 1, 1971. At a construction cost of $2.5 million the museum building, designed by Arthur Erickson, opened in 1976. That same year, the university launched a normal school program under the direction of Sally Rogow to train educators on methods to teach students with multiple disabilities or who were visually impaired.

UBC was the host for the International Congress of Mathematicians in 1974. The Proceedings of the Congress were edited by Ralph Duncan James in four volumes.

In 1993, UBC concluded its "World of Opportunity" capital campaign that started in 1988. In total the university raised $262 million for the campaign. An additional $72 million in "non-campaign fundraising" was also raised. During the administration of President Strangway, UBC abandoned its previous design and planning process and private donors started to have more influence on building design.

In 2015, UBC concluded its "Start an Evolution" capital campaign. The campaign's quiet phase started in April 2008 and it launched publicly in September 2011. The initial goal was to raise $1.5 billion. The campaign surpassed that goal and raised $1.624 billion.

UBC's 15th president was Professor Santa J. Ono. He assumed the presidency on August 15, 2016. He served previously as the 28th president of the University of Cincinnati. Dr. Martha Piper – who served as the 11th president of the university – served as interim president from September 1, 2015, to June 30, 2016, following the resignation of Dr. Arvind Gupta.

In early May 2020, UBC announced it would be holding a virtual graduation for the class of 2020 amid concerns over the COVID-19 pandemic. The university received $419,248 from the Government of Canada to promote uptake of COVID-19 vaccines among public health leaders, community figures, Indigenous peoples and leadership in municipal government.

== Campuses ==
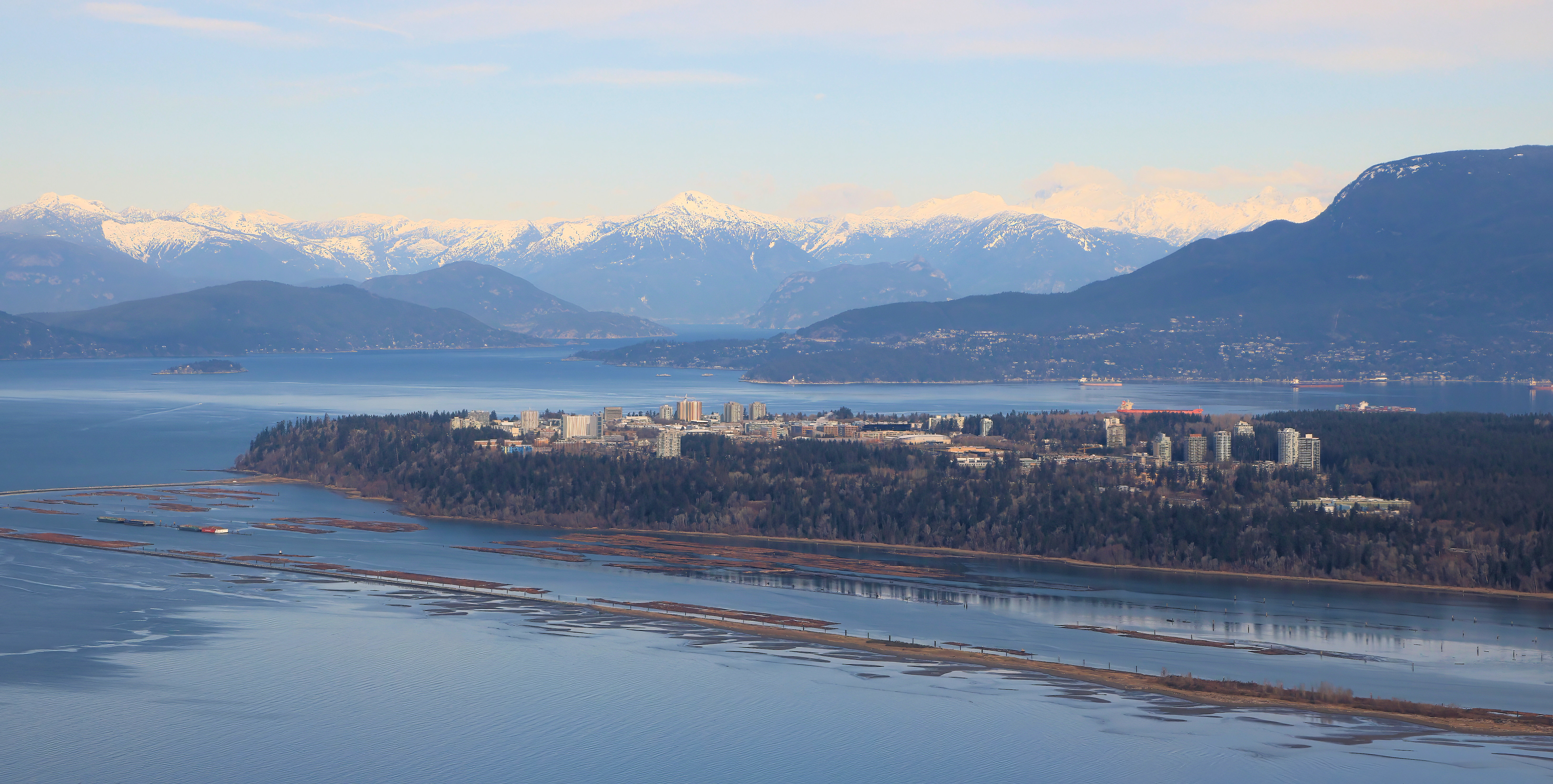
Aerial view of the Vancouver Campus

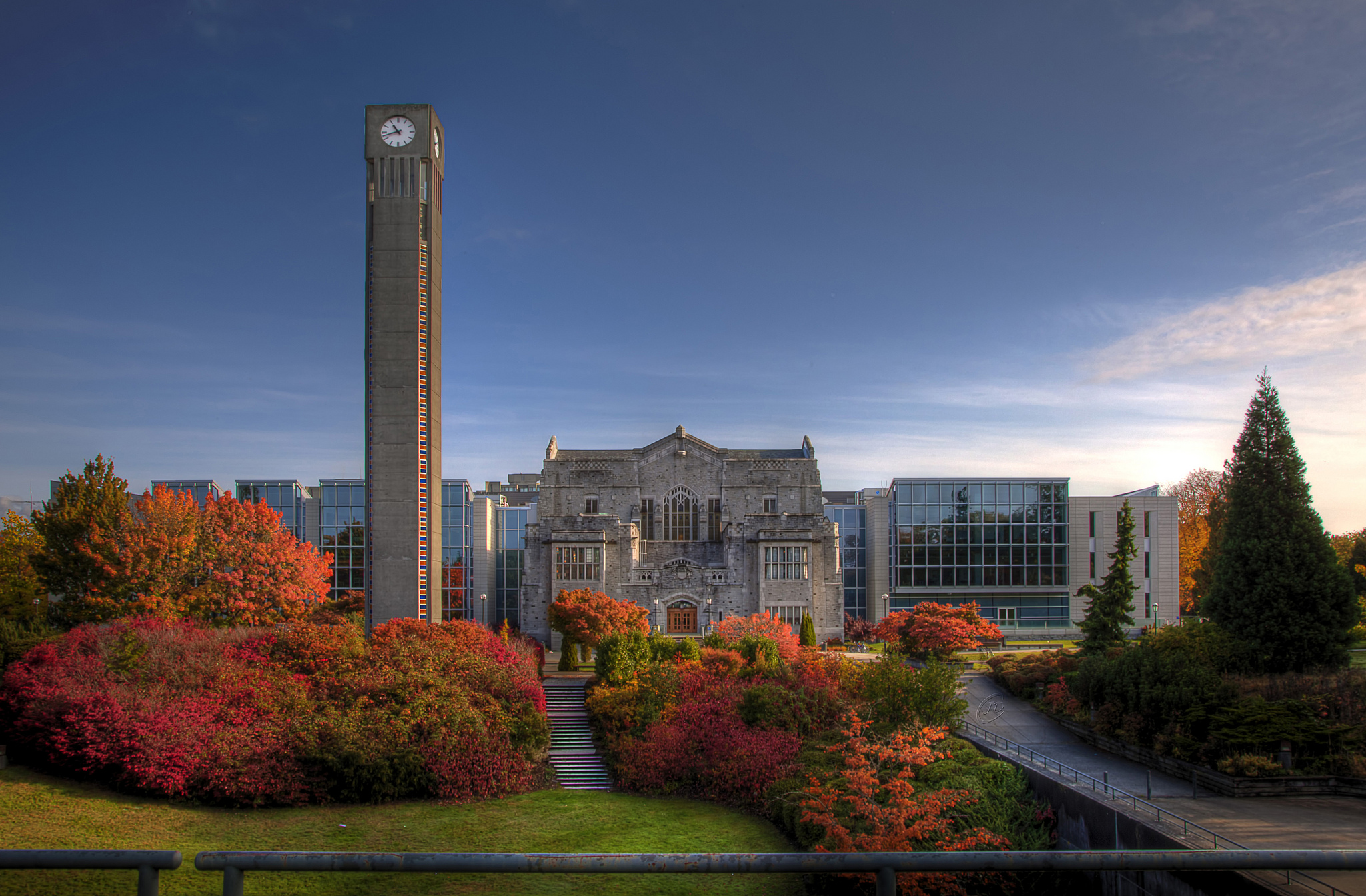
The Irving K. Barber Library and Ladner Clock Tower

=== Vancouver ===
The main campus is located at Point Grey, approximately 10 kilometres (6.2 mi) from downtown Vancouver. It lies on forcefully taken territory of the Musqueam people. It is near several beaches and has views of the North Shore Mountains. The 7.63-square-kilometre (1,890-acre) Pacific Spirit Regional Park serves as a green-belt between the campus and the city. Buildings on the Vancouver campus occupy 1.09 million m^{2} (11.7 million sq ft) gross on 1.7 square kilometres (420 acres) of maintained land. The campus street plan is mostly in a grid of malls (some of which are pedestrian-only). Lower Mall and West Mall are in the southwestern part of the peninsula, with Main, East and Wesbrook Malls northeast of them.

The campus is not within Vancouver's city limits and therefore UBC is policed by the RCMP rather than the Vancouver Police Department. However, the Vancouver Fire Department provides service to UBC under a contract. In addition to UBC RCMP, there is also the UBC Campus Security that patrols the campus. Postage sent to any building on campus includes 'Vancouver' in the address.

UBC Vancouver also has two satellite campuses within the City of Vancouver: at Vancouver General Hospital, for the medical sciences and at Robson Square in downtown Vancouver, for part-time credit and non-credit programs. UBC is also a partner in the consortium backing Great Northern Way Campus Ltd and is affiliated with a group of adjacent theological colleges, which include the Vancouver School of Theology, Regent College, Carey Theological College and Corpus Christi College.

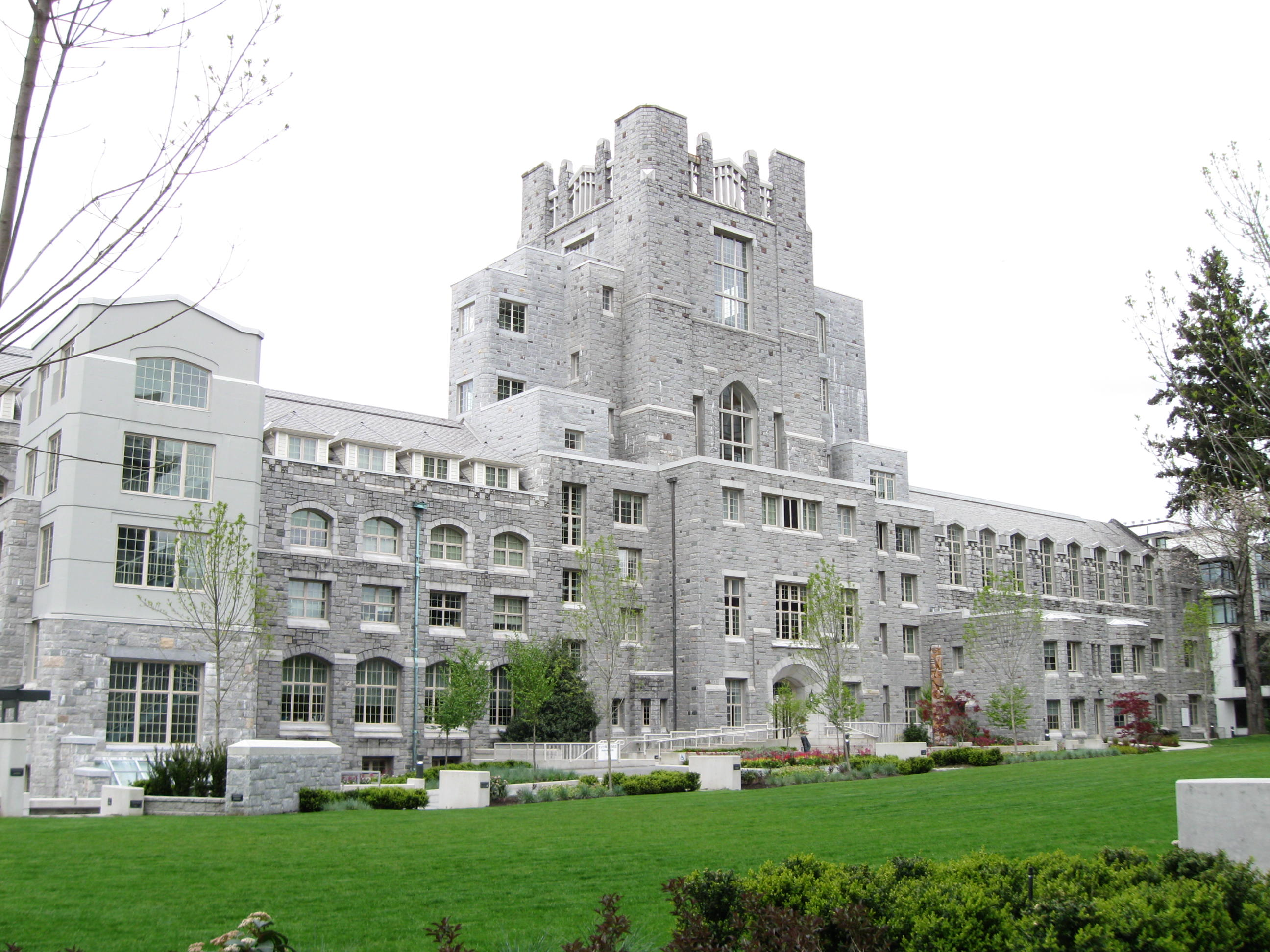
The Iona Building, built in 1927, is currently home to the UBC Vancouver School of Economics. It previously housed the Vancouver School of Theology.

The campus is home to numerous gardens. The UBC Botanical Garden and Centre for Plant Research, the first UBC department, holds a collection of over 8,000 different kinds of plants used for research, conservation and education. The UBC botanical garden's original site was at the "Old Arboretum". All that remains of it today are trees planted in 1916 by John Davidson. The old arboretum is now home to many buildings including the First Nations House of Learning. The Nitobe Memorial Garden, built to honour Japanese scholar Inazo Nitobe, features a fully functional Japanese tea house called Ichibō-an, surrounded by an outer roji tea garden with a waiting bench, and an inner garden. The garden is behind the university's Asian Centre, which was built using steel girders from Japan's exhibit at Osaka Expo.

The campus also features the Chan Centre for the Performing Arts: a performing arts centre containing the Chan Shun Concert Hall, Telus Studio Theatre and the Royal Bank Cinema. It is often the site of convocation ceremonies and the filming location for the 4400 Center on the television show The 4400, as well as the Madacorp entrance set on Kyle XY. It has also been featured as the Cloud 9 Ballroom in the re-imagined Battlestar Galactica (Season 1, Episode 11: Colonial Day).

Since the mid-1980s UBC has worked with property developers to build several large residential developments throughout UBC's campus. Such developments include: Chancellor Place, Hampton Place, Hawthorn Place and Wesbrook Village.

=== Okanagan ===
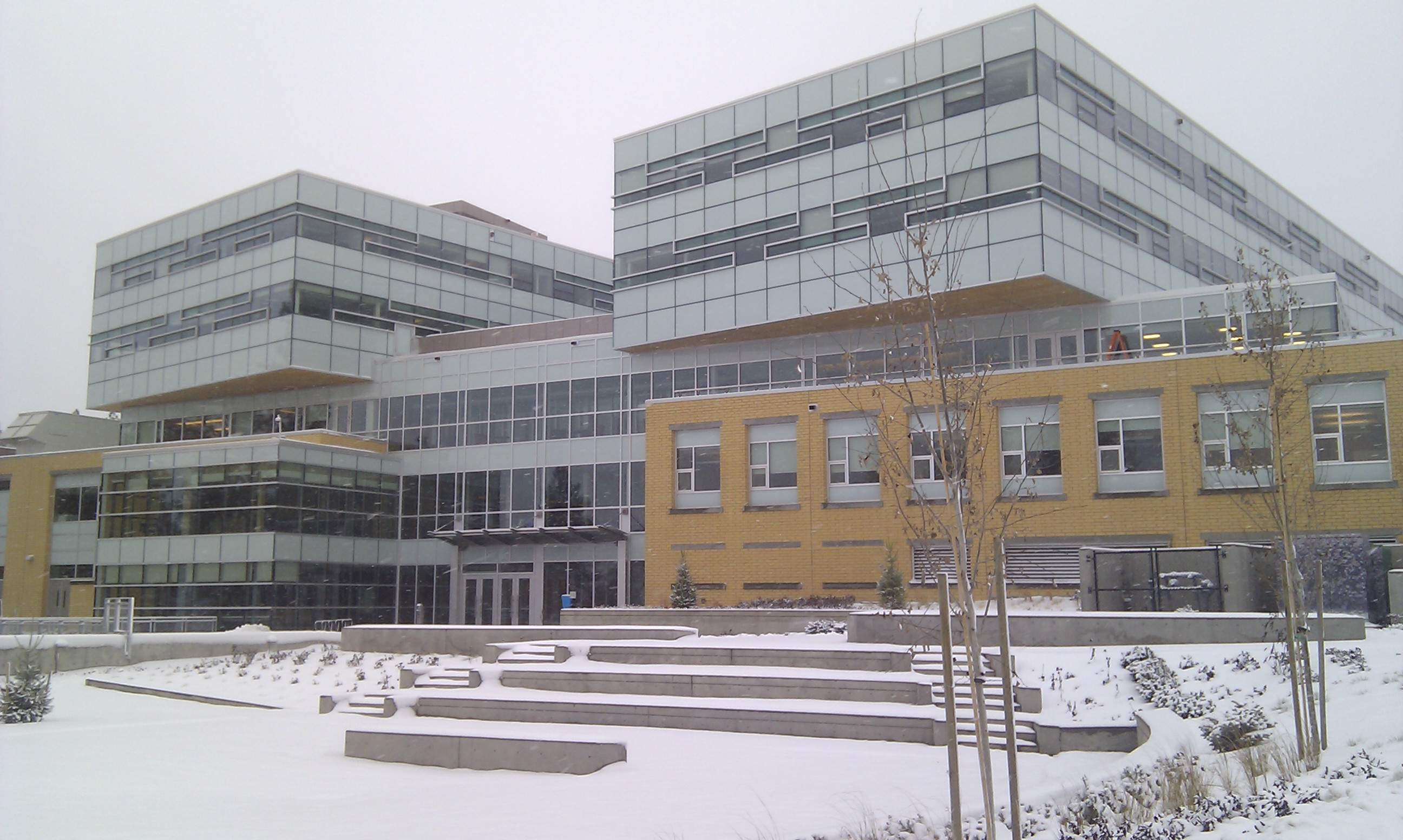
The Engineering, Management and Education (EME) Complex at UBC Okanagan

The Okanagan Campus was established in 2005 on what was previously the North Kelowna Campus of Okanagan University College, next to Kelowna International Airport. It was founded in partnership with the Syilx Okanagan Nation and it lies on their ancestral and forcefully taken territory.

The campus had a 2019 enrolment of 10,708 undergraduate and graduate students and has its own academic senate. UBC Okanagan offers 62 undergraduate and 19 graduate programs in a diversity of disciplines including Arts, Science, Fine Arts, Engineering, Nursing, Human Kinetics, Education, Management, Social Work and Interdisciplinary Graduate Studies. UBC's Faculty of Medicine delivers medical doctor training through the Southern Medical Program with facilities at UBC Okanagan and a clinical academic campus at Kelowna General Hospital.

From 2005 through 2012, the Okanagan campus completed a $450 million expansion with construction of several residential, teaching and research buildings. The expansion included the Charles E. Fipke Centre for Innovative Research, the University Centre, the Engineering Management and Education building, the Arts and Sciences Centre, the Reichwald Health Sciences Centre and several new student residence buildings. The Commons building was opened in 2019 as an expansion to the Library building. Two additional student housing facilities, Skeena and Nechako, opened in 2020 and 2021 respectively.

In 2010, UBC Okanagan campus grew from 105 ha to 208.6 ha. Like the Point Grey campus, the Okanagan campus attracts Canadian and international students.

UBC Okanagan is currently expanding its campus to downtown Kelowna. Construction on the 43 storey downtown campus building was approved in August 2023 and is expected to be completed by 2027. Eight storeys will be used as academic space for health programs, as the campus will be in close proximity to Interior Health offices and Kelowna General Hospital. The building will also include public engagement spaces, an art gallery, cafés, retailers and 473 rental housing units.

=== Libraries, archives and galleries ===
The UBC Library, which has 7.8 million volumes, 2.1 million e-books, more than 370,000 e-journals and more than 700,000 items in locally produced digital collections, is Canada's second-largest academic library. From 2014 to 2015, there were more than 3.8 million on-campus visits and over 9.5 million visits to its website.

The library has fifteen branches and divisions across the UBC Vancouver and UBC Okanagan campuses.

The former Main Library underwent construction and was renamed the Irving K. Barber Learning Centre. Opened in April 2008, the Learning Centre incorporates the centre heritage block of the old Main Library with two new expansion wings and features an automated storage and retrieval system (ASRS), the first of its kind in Canada.

UBC has a number of different collections that have been donated and acquired. Major General Victor Odlum CB, CMG, DSO, VD donated his library of 10,000 books, which has been housed in "the Rockwoods Centre Library" of the UBC Library since 1963. After Videomatica's 2011 closure, UBC and SFU acquired their $1.7-million collection. UBC received about 28,000 movie DVDs, 4,000 VHS titles and 900 Blu-ray discs which are housed at UBC Library's Koerner branch on the Vancouver campus. In 2014, renowned art collector and antiques specialist, Uno Langmann, donated the Uno Langmann Family Collection of B.C. Photographs, which consists of more than 18,000 rare and unique early photographs from the 1850s to the 1970s. It is considered the premiere private collection of early provincial photos and an important illustrated history of early photographic methods. In 2016, the library acquired one of the world's most rare and extraordinary books, the Kelmscott Chaucer from 1896. The book was printed in a limited edition of only 438 copies, but there are only 48 copies in the world with its particular type of binding.

The Morris and Helen Belkin Art Gallery at UBC is mandated to research, exhibit, collect, publish, educate and develop programs in the field of contemporary art and in contemporary approaches to the practice of art history and criticism. The Belkin maintains and manages the university's art collection of over 5,000 objects, including the Outdoor Art Collection and an archive of over 30,000 items. Works from the permanent collection and archives, with an emphasis on recent acquisitions, are exhibited on an annual basis and are also used by other institutions for research and loans. The Belkin has an active publication program and participates in programming that includes lectures, tours, concerts and symposia related to art history, criticism and curating.

=== Sustainability ===
==== CIRS building ====
The University of British Columbia Centre for Interactive Research on Sustainability (CIRS) building is designed to be net positive in four environmental aspects. It uses energy obtained from the Earth and Ocean Sciences (EOSC) Building, which wastes around 900 megawatts due to ten air changes every hour, to heat itself. The building's wood holds nearly 600 tons of carbon, offsetting more carbon than its construction and maintenance created. Sustainable features include a water supply sourced entirely from rainwater, an on-site sewage treatment facility converting waste into reusable water and compost, and the use of wood from pine beetle-killed trees, minimizing the need for logging.

The building relies primarily on solar energy for electricity, and all areas use natural lighting during the day. These green technologies and sustainable operating practices reduce the building's ecological footprint and enhance the well-being of its occupants.

==== Water conservation initiatives ====
For over 20 years, UBC has implemented water consumption policies through two initiatives, ECOTrek and UBC Renew. ECOTrek is Canada's largest sustainability project, which involved a massive water and energy-saving initiative, rebuilding almost 300 academic buildings at UBC. This project achieved a World Clean Energy nomination. The water management aspect included updates to toilets, urinals, basins, and water-cooled equipment, along with the installation of steam and water meters to monitor and quantify water consumption across campus.

The UBC Renew project focuses on renovating aging institutional buildings instead of demolishing and constructing new ones. Demolition can have significant environmental impacts, such as soil pollution, increased air pollutants, and higher water consumption. Renovating old buildings helps save large volumes of water and reduces energy costs.

The university retrofitted its facilities with composting toilets; however, these did not function correctly. As of 2019, UBC consumed about four billion litres of water a year, which could fill 1,600 Olympic-sized swimming pools.

==== Community efforts ====
Beyond the UBC sustainability team, a student-driven initiative is taking place in making a bottled-water free campus in hopes of reducing bottled water on campus and to encourage students to engage in environmentally friendly behaviours. Production of bottled water puts strain on the environment and increases landfill space. According to the World Wide Fund for Nature 2001 report, about 1.5 million tons of plastic is used for bottling 89 billion litres of water each year.

== Governance and academics ==
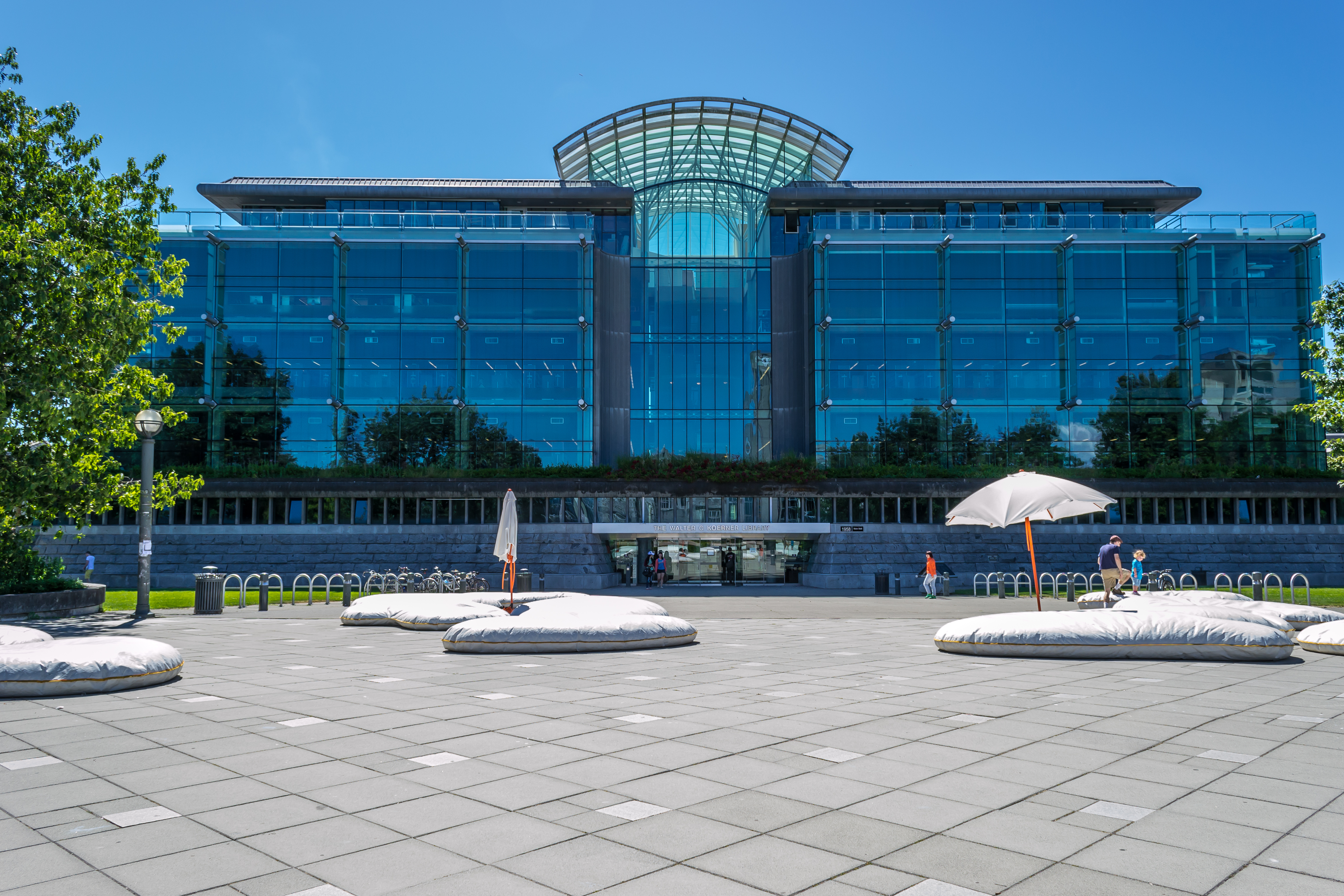
The Walter C. Koerner Library and president's office, designed by UBC alumnus Arthur Erickson

UBC's administration, as mandated by the University Act, is composed of a chancellor, convocation, board, senate and faculties of the university. The board of governors, which is primarily appointed by the provincial government, manages property and financial affairs, while the senate manages the university's academic matters. Both include faculty and students who are elected. Degrees and diplomas are conferred by the convocation, which is composed of alumni, administrators and faculty, with a quorum of twenty members. The president of the university is the university's chief executive officer and a member of the senate, board of governors, convocation and also serves as vice chancellor.

=== Presidents ===
- Frank F. Wesbrook (1st President, 1913–1918)
- Leonard S. Klinck (2nd President, 1919–1944)
- Norman A.M. MacKenzie (3rd President, 1944–1962)
- John B. Macdonald (4th President, 1962–1967)
- F. Kenneth Hare (5th President, 1968–1969)
- Walter H. Gage (6th President, 1969–1975)
- Douglas T. Kenny (7th President, 1975–1983)
- K. George Pedersen (8th President, 1983–1985)
- Robert H. T. Smith (9th President, 1985)
- David W. Strangway (10th President, 1985–1997)
- Martha C. Piper (11th President, 1997–2006)
- Stephen J. Toope (12th President, 2006–2014)
- Arvind Gupta (13th President, 2014–2015)
- Martha Piper (Interim President, 2015–2016)
- Santa J. Ono (15th President, 2016–2022)
- Deborah Buszard (Interim President, 2022–2023)
- Benoit-Antoine Bacon (17th President, 2023–present)

=== Faculties and schools ===
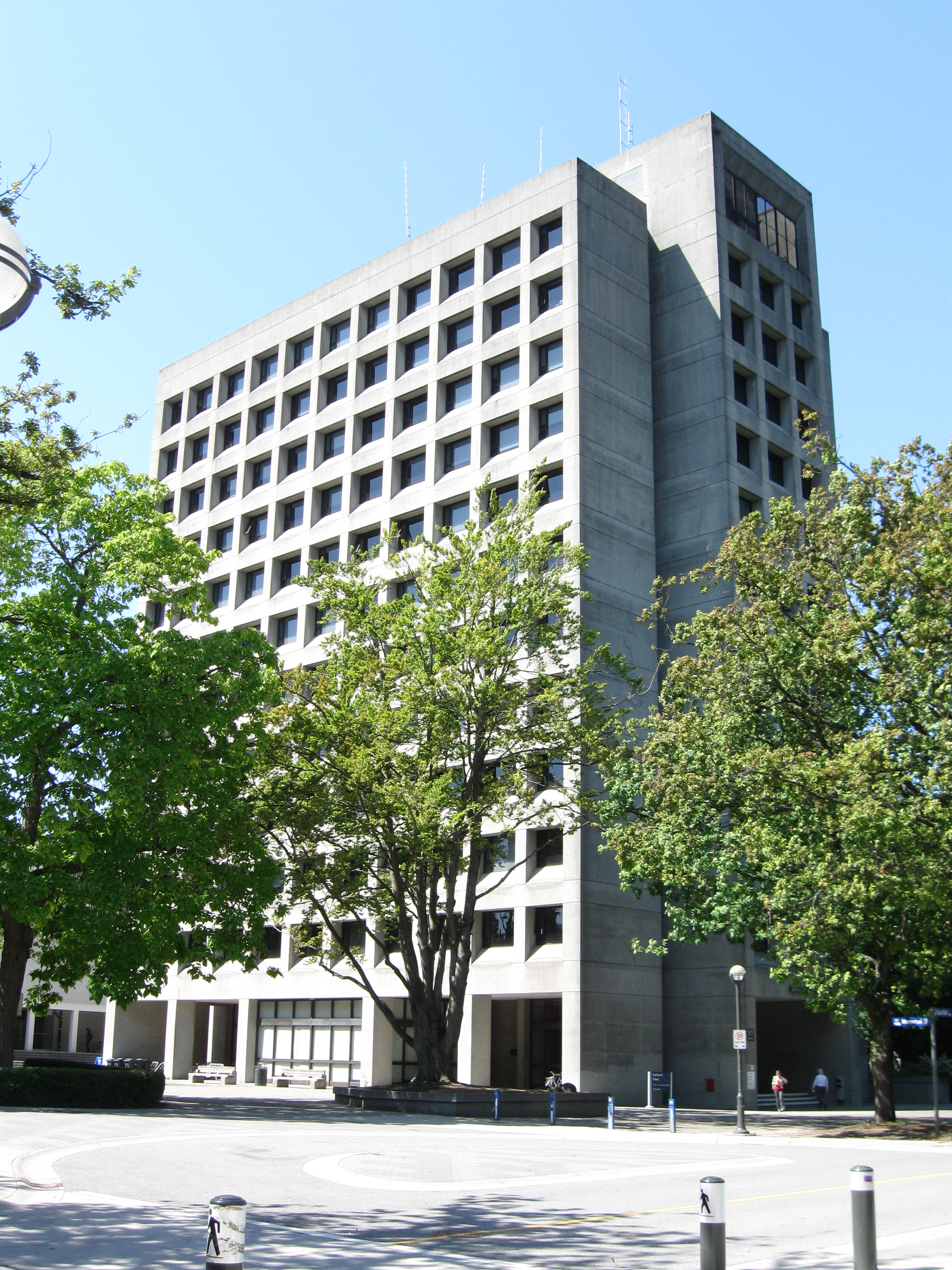
Buchanan Tower, home to the offices of various departments in the Faculty of Arts, such as English, History, French, Hispanic and Italian Studies, and the Institute for Gender, Race, Sexuality, and Social Justice.

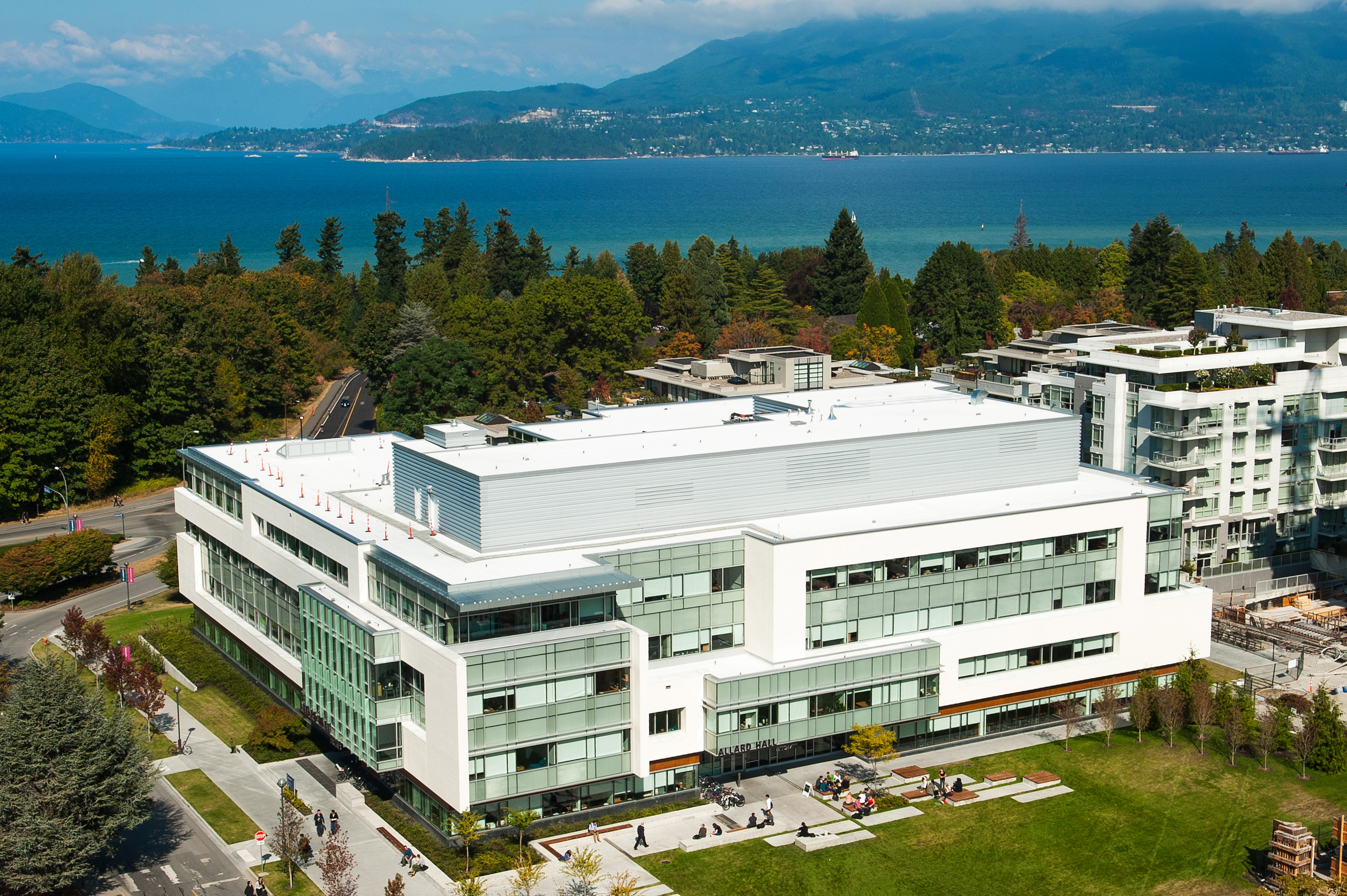
Aerial view of the Peter A. Allard School of Law at UBC

UBC's academic activity is organized into "faculties" and "schools". UBC has twelve faculties at its Vancouver campus and seven at its Okanagan campus. At the Vancouver campus, the Faculty of Arts, which dates back to the 1915 Fairview Campus, is the largest faculty with twenty departments and schools. With the split of the Faculty of Arts and Science in 1964, the Faculty of Science is the second largest faculty with nine departments. The Sauder School of Business is UBC's Faculty of Commerce and Business Administration. The School of Architecture offers a program accredited by the Canadian Architectural Certification Board at the bachelor level (B.Arch.) and the master's level (M.Arch.). As of December 2012, a new school was created: UBC Vancouver School of Economics in conjunction with the Sauder School of Business. The university's first inter-faculty school, the School of Biomedical Engineering, was established in 2017 as a partnership between the Faculties of Applied Science and Medicine.

In 2014, UBC created a new "International Programs" designation separate from the traditional definition of a faculty. To accompany this designation, the university created Vantage College to allow international students who do not meet the English language requirements for general admission to enter the university's transition program.

==== Dual undergraduate degree with Sciences Po ====
The dual degree program is a highly selective program in which undergraduate students earn two Bachelor of Arts degrees from both Sciences Po in France and UBC in four years. Previously, students could earn one Bachelor of Arts and one Bachelor of Commerce (Sauder School of Business); however, this program was discontinued with the last student intake occurring in September 2017. Currently, students in the dual degree program can only earn a Bachelor of Arts degree from UBC, along with a Bachelor of Arts degree from Sciences Po, which can both be in different majors pertaining to the social sciences. Students spend two years at one of three Sciences Po regional campuses in France (Le Havre, Menton, or Reims), each of which is devoted to a particular region of the world. After two years, students matriculate at UBC. Graduates are guaranteed admission to a Sciences Po graduate program within one-year of graduation.

=== Reputation ===
University rankings

World rankings
- ARWU World: 54
- QS World: 45
- THE World: 44
- THE Reputation: 36
- THE Employability: 36
- 2

Canadian rankings
- QS National: 3
- THE National: 3
- USNWR National: 2
- Maclean's Medical/Doctoral: 3
- Maclean's Reputation: 2

The University of British Columbia has ranked in a number of post-secondary rankings. In the 2022 Academic Ranking of World Universities rankings, the university ranked 44th in the world and second in Canada. The 2026 QS World University Rankings ranked the University 40th in the world and third in Canada. The 2024 Times Higher Education World University Rankings ranked the University 41st in the world and second in Canada. In the 2022–23 U.S. News & World Report Best Global University Ranking, the university ranked 35th in the world and second in Canada. The Canadian-based Maclean's magazine ranked the University of British Columbia third in their 2023 Canadian Medical Doctoral University category and in their 2023 reputation survey. The university was ranked in spite of having opted out – along with several other universities in Canada – of participating in Maclean's graduate survey since 2006. In Newsweek's 2011 global university rankings, the university was ranked eighth among institutions outside the United States and second in Canada (after the University of Toronto).

Along with academic and research-based rankings, the university has also been ranked by publications that evaluate the employment prospects of its graduates. In the Times Higher Education's 2022 global employability ranking, the university ranked 36th in the world and third in Canada.

=== International partnerships ===
UBC students can study abroad for a semester or a year at over 200 partner institutions.

=== Enrolment ===
The mean admission average during the 2023–24 school year for domestic first-year students was 89–91 per cent. The acceptance rate for domestic applications in 2025 was 50.4 per cent, of which 57.1 per cent enrolled. In 2014/15, UBC employed 3,270 full-time Faculty members, 10,942 non-faculty members and 8,031 students. It reported 871 unpaid employees.

==== Vancouver enrolment ====
University of British Columbia has a total of 72,585 students across both campuses. International students, amounting to 20,237, make up 28% of the university's student population. There are 2,303 indigenous students, making up 3.2% of the student population.

Program Type
	Undergraduate				Graduate		Other
	Diploma & Certificate	Baccalaureate Degree	Post-Baccalaureate Degree	Non-Degree	Master's Degree	Doctoral Degree	Residents
Student Enrolment	2,314	50,631	3,070	2,207	8,507	4,305	1,551

=== Research ===
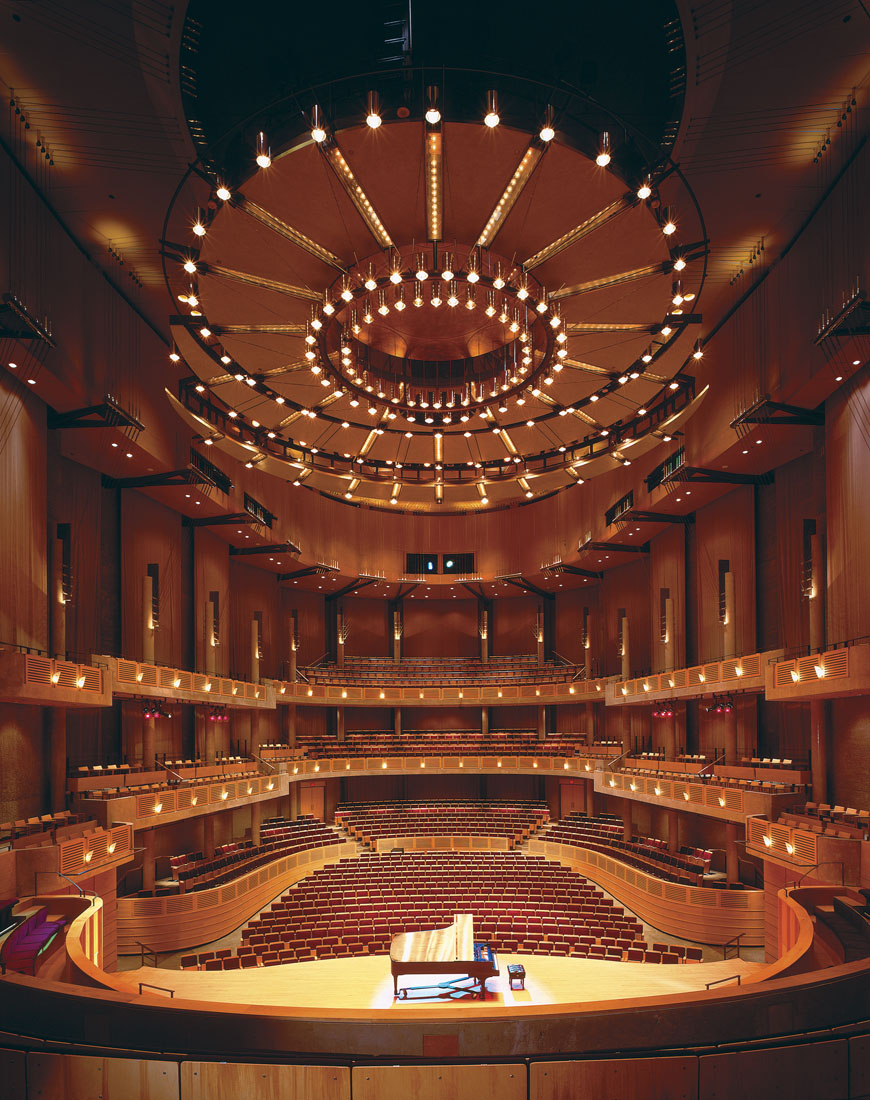
The Chan Centre for the Performing Arts, designed by Bing Thom, B.Arch. '66

The University of British Columbia is a member of Universitas 21, an international association of research-led institutions and the only Canadian member of the Association of Pacific Rim Universities, a consortium of 42 leading research universities in the Pacific Rim. In 2017, the University of British Columbia had the second-largest sponsored research income (external sources of funding) out of any Canadian university, totalling C$577 million. In the same year, the university's faculty averaged a sponsored research income of $249,900, the eighth highest in the country, while graduate students averaged a sponsored research income of $55,200.

The university has been ranked on several bibliometric university rankings, which uses citation analysis to evaluate the impact a university has on academic publications. In 2019, the Performance Ranking of Scientific Papers for World Universities ranked UBC 27th in the world and second in Canada. The University Ranking by Academic Performance 2018–19 rankings placed the university 27th in the world and second in Canada.

The university operates and manages several research centres:

- In 1972, a consortium of the University of British Columbia and four other universities from Alberta and British Columbia established the Bamfield Marine Sciences Centre. Located on Vancouver Island, the centre provides year-round research facilities and technical assistance for biologists, ecologists and oceanographers.
- The Peter Wall Institute for Advanced Studies is an interdisciplinary research institute for fundamental research in the Sciences, Social Sciences and Humanities.
- The UBC Farm is a 24-hectare (59-acre) learning and research farm in UBC's South Campus area. It features Saturday Farm Markets from early June until early October, selling organic produce and eggs to the community.
- TRIUMF, a laboratory specializing in particle and nuclear physics, is also situated at the university. The name was formerly an acronym for Tri-University Meson Facility, but TRIUMF is now owned and operated by a consortium of eleven Canadian universities. The consortium runs TRIUMF through a contribution of funds from the National Research Council of Canada and makes TRIUMF's facilities available to Canadian scientists and to scientists from around the world.
- BC Centre on Substance Use (BCCSU) and UBC have established Professorships in Cannabis Science in 2018 following Canada's legalization of cannabis.
- The Centre for the Study of Democratic Institutions is a research institute for the teaching and study of innovation in democratic practice and institutions. Established in 2002, the centre conducts research and teaching in cooperation with scholars, public officials, NGOs and students. The centre is formally housed in the UBC School of Public Policy and Global Affairs (SPPGA) and operates in association with faculty in the UBC Department of Political Science. It was initially funded from the Merilees Chair through a donation by Gail and Stephen Jarislowsky.
- The Institute for Gender, Race, Sexuality, and Social Justice. Since 1991, operated as the Centre for Women’s and Gender Studies, then in 2012 became the Institute for Gender, Race, Sexuality and Social Justice.
- The Vancouver Institute for the Americas Since 1998 until 2007, focused on international development programs, multi-national educational reforms, and consulting workshops aligned with UNESCO and CIDA.
- The Vancouver Institute Since 1916, the Vancouver Institute has brought the University of British Columbia and Vancouver community together through free public lectures and discussions.
- The Stewart Blusson Quantum Matter Institute, one of three Canadian research institutes focused on quantum materials and technology research, was established in 2015 with the support of the Canada First Excellence Research Fund and a donation from Stewart Blusson.

In 2017, UBC inked a $3 million research agreement with Huawei for big data and fuel cell technology. The university refused to release the agreement without an access to information request.

=== Indigenous ===
UBC's Longhouse is the university's centre for Indigenous activities. The university has an associate dean of Indigenous Education and has developed a governing board and senate policies as well as Aboriginal governed councils within the university structure. UBC offers degrees in First Nations and Indigenous Studies through a program in the Arts Faculty, and a Chinook Diploma Program in the Sauder School of Business; it also runs the Chinook Summer Biz Camp, to foster entrepreneurship among First Nations and Métis high school students. It hosts a Bridge Through Sport Program, Summer Science Program, Native Youth Program and Cedar Day Camp and After school Program. Its First Nations Forestry Initiatives were developed in partnership with specific Aboriginal communities to meet their needs in their more remote areas.

== Finances ==
In 2024–25, UBC's budget exceeded $3.8 billion and the university posted balanced financial results. Government grants account for approximately 40 per cent of total revenues, and student tuition approximately 41 per cent.

=== Tuition ===
Tuition fees vary significantly between Canadian citizens (and permanent residents) and international students. In addition, for both undergraduate and graduate programs, tuition rates vary among the university's faculties. Students must also pay for various living expenses such as housing, food and health care. As of the 2012–2013 school year, these expenses were estimated at around $13,000 CAD per academic year.

==== Undergraduate tuition ====
UBC tuition for 2024 was $6,079.20 before adding other mandatory administrative fees for a Canadian student in a basic 30-unit program, though there is some variation in this figure. Tuition for international students is significantly higher (8–9 times higher than domestic students). In 2024, tuition for international students ranged from $49,548.40 CAD to $64,651.30 CAD.

In 2001–02, UBC had one of the lowest undergraduate tuition rates in Canada, at an average of $2,181 CAD per year for a full-time program due to a government-instituted tuition freeze.

In 2001, the BC Liberal party defeated the NDP in British Columbia and lifted the tuition freeze. In 2002–03 undergraduate and graduate tuition rose by an average of 30% and up to 40% in some faculties. This has led to better facilities, but also to student unrest and contributed to a teaching assistant union strike.

UBC again increased tuition by 30% in the 2003–04 year, again by approximately 15% in the 2004–05 season and 2% in the 2005–06 and 2006–07 years. Increases were lower than expected because, in the 2005 Speech from the Throne, the government announced tuition increases would be capped to inflation. In 2006–07, the Canadian average undergraduate tuition fee was $4,347 and the BC average was $4,960. In 2014, the board of governors passed a one-time 10% tuition increase for all new incoming international students. In December 2015, UBC's board of governors passed a motion increasing international tuition by more than 46.8% for the academic years 2016–17, 2017–18, 2018–2019. This announcement was met with indignation by many of the university's students as this was the second major increase in international tuition in less than a year, taking total international student tuition fee increases to above 60% within 4 years (minimum international tuition will be bench marked at $35,071 CAD in the year 2018–19).

==== Graduate tuition ====
In the academic year 2019/2020, graduate programs assess tuition fees that vary significantly, depending on the program and the student's citizenship. All PhD students, though, are guaranteed a minimum funding package of $24,000 a year for four years, though policies differ again by program.

== Student life ==
=== Student representation ===
The Alma Mater Society of the University of British Columbia, or AMS, represents UBC undergraduate students within the Vancouver campus. The society's mandate is to improve the quality of educational, social and personal lives of UBC students. The AMS lobbies the UBC administration on behalf of the student body, provides services such as the AMS/GSS Health and Dental Plan, supports and administers student clubs and maintains the Student Union Building, known as the Nest, and the services it houses. A constituency (undergraduate society) exists within each school and faculty of the university and acts as the subsidiary of the AMS within those schools and faculties.

The Graduate Student Society (GSS), which operates as an independent entity, represents graduate students. A council representing each graduate program and an executive elected by graduate students as a whole governs the GSS.

The university also has elected student representatives sitting on, as voting members, the board of governors (three student representatives) and the academic senate (18 student representatives), as laid out in the British Columbia University Act. Although the university is the official body that elects the students, the university delegates these representative elections to the AMS.

On the Okanagan Campus, the Students' Union Okanagan, or UBCSUO, is the elected representation of the student body. Composed of a board of directors and executive team, the UBCSUO lobbies the administration and provincial government on behalf of the student body, manages the student health and dental plan, as well as hosts social programming throughout the year. The Student Union Offices are located within the University Centre Building. In the wake of the COVID-19 Pandemic, the SUO initiated the Emergency Bursary Program which supported UBC students with nearly $1,000,000 in emergency funding.

=== Student demographics ===
In the 2020–21 academic year, female students made up 57 per cent of UBC Vancouver's student body and 53 per cent of UBC Okanagan's student body.

=== Student facilities ===
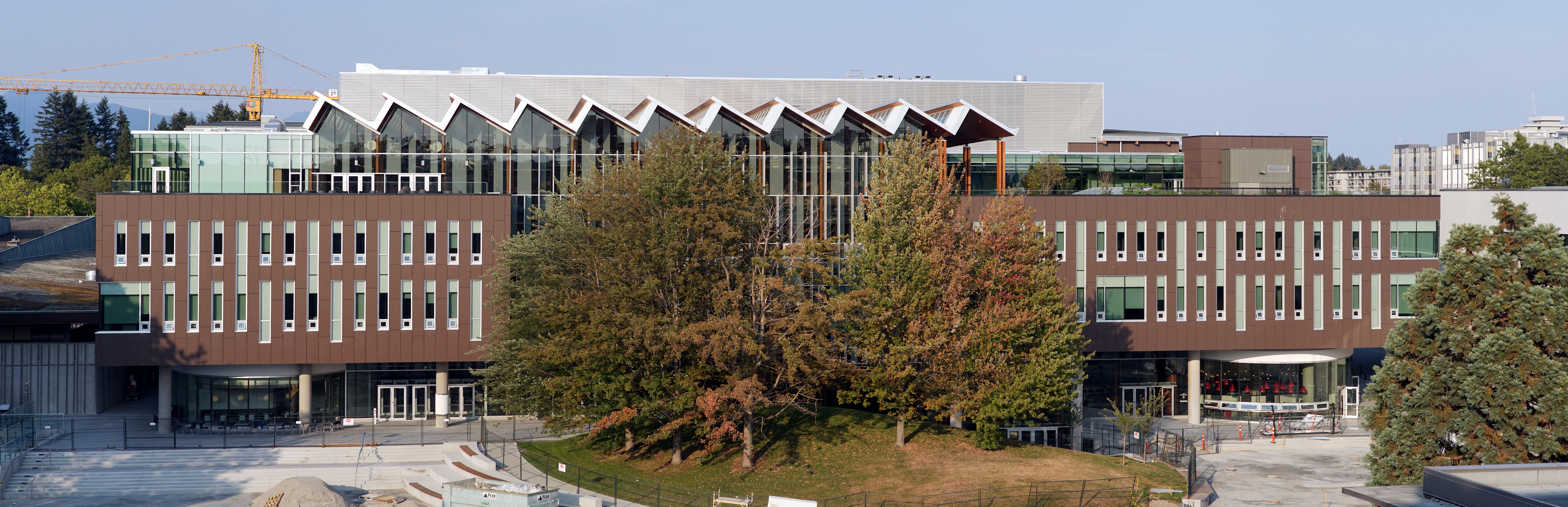
The new Student Union Building, which opened in 2015

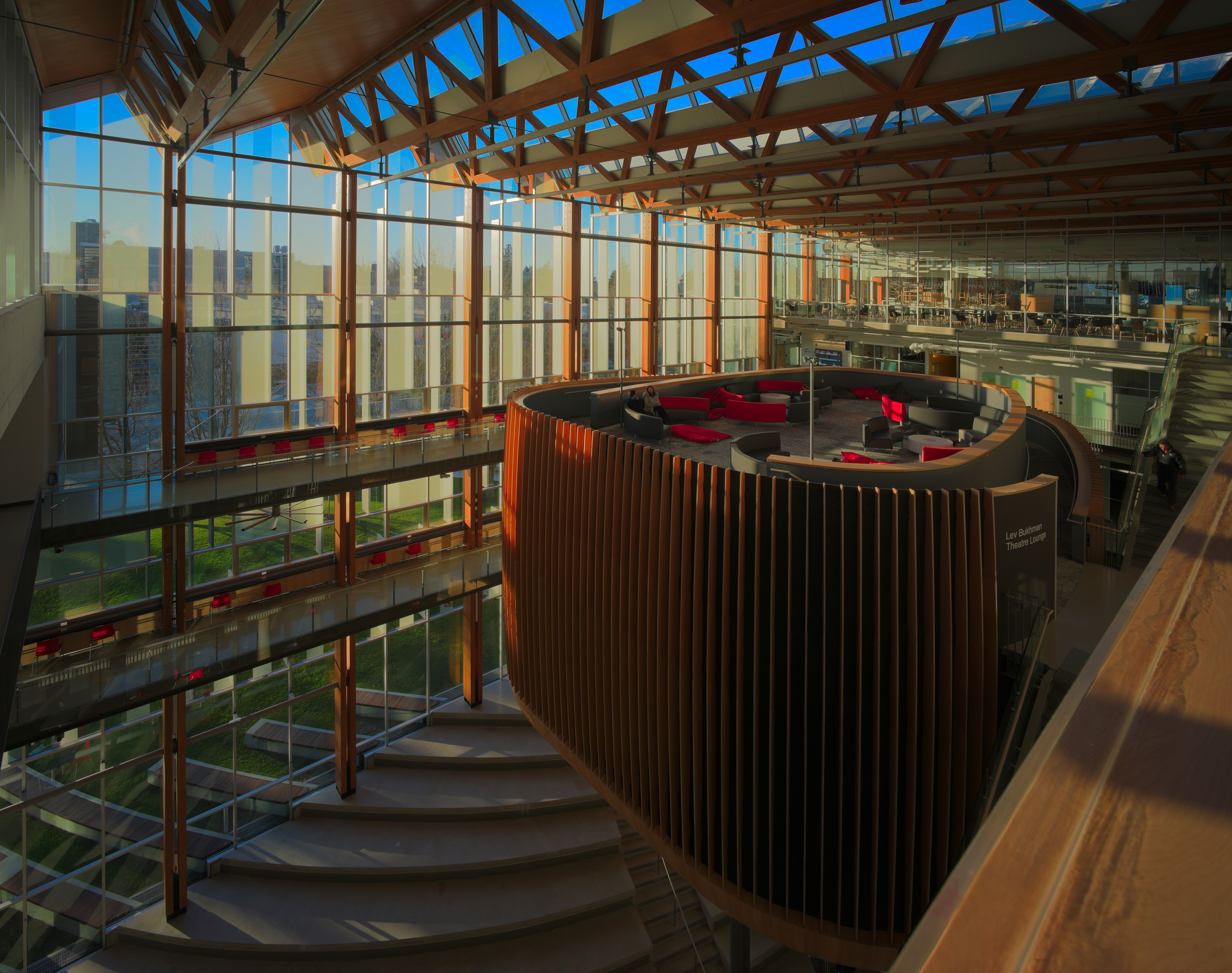
The interior of the new Student Union Building contains a "bird's nest" where students may relax and study.

The heart of student activity at UBC Vancouver is the centrally located Student Union Building, generally called the AMS Student Nest, or simply "the Nest". Opened on June 1, 2015, The Nest, built for $107 million, is much larger than its predecessor, and has numerous amenities including a performance centre, an art exhibition space ("Hatch Art Gallery"), a large ballroom, a three-storey climbing wall, radio broadcast facilities, a daycare, shops and food outlets, a pub ("The Gallery"), a nightclub ("The Pit"), and a 10,740 square foot rooftop garden and public space with a water feature and outdoor seating. Connected to the Nest via underground tunnel in the adjacent Student Life Building, the 425-seat Norman Bouchard Memorial Theatre ("The Norm Theatre") is also run by the student union.

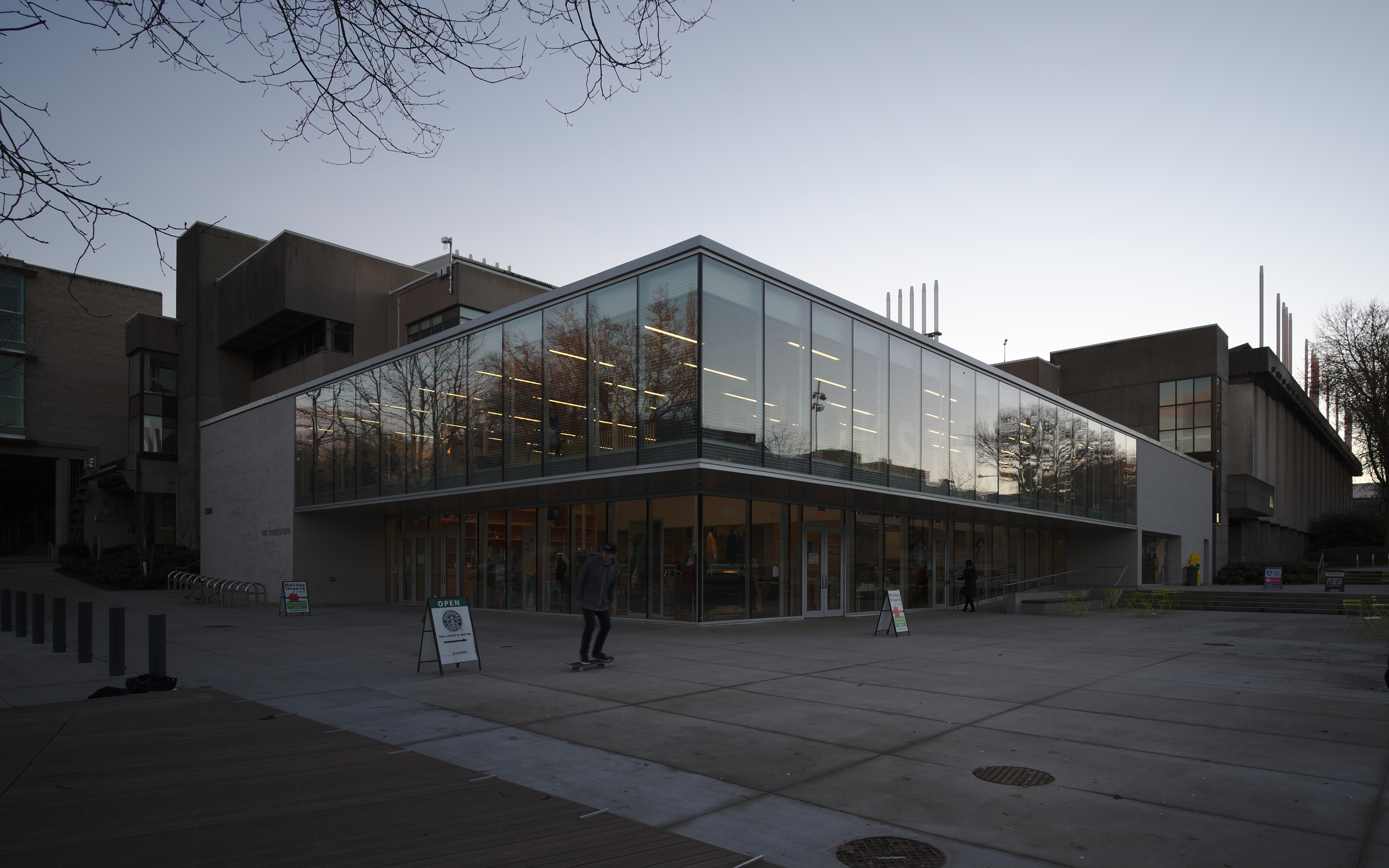
Exterior of the main UBC Bookstore.

Other student facilities on campus include the Ladha Science Student Centre (funded through a donation from Abdul Ladha, a levy on Science undergraduate students, the VP Students and the dean of Science) and the Arts Student Center. The UBC Bookstore's two locations on the Vancouver campus: the main store at 6200 University Boulevard and a store at Sauder School of Business join the stores at the Okanagan and Robson Square Campuses in offering a variety of products and services. The bookstores return a dividend to UBC each year, which is re-invested in the campus or in student and community organizations.

=== Greek organizations ===
UBC's 19 Greek organizations make up Canada's largest and most active Greek system. The Alma Mater Society recognizes an Inter Fraternal Council (IFC) as a club and weekly meetings of the fraternities under IFC take place at their respective fraternity houses. There are eleven fraternities on campus, the first of which was Zeta Psi, in January 1926.

UBC was ranked eighth among Canada's top party schools by the website Ask Men.

=== Residences ===
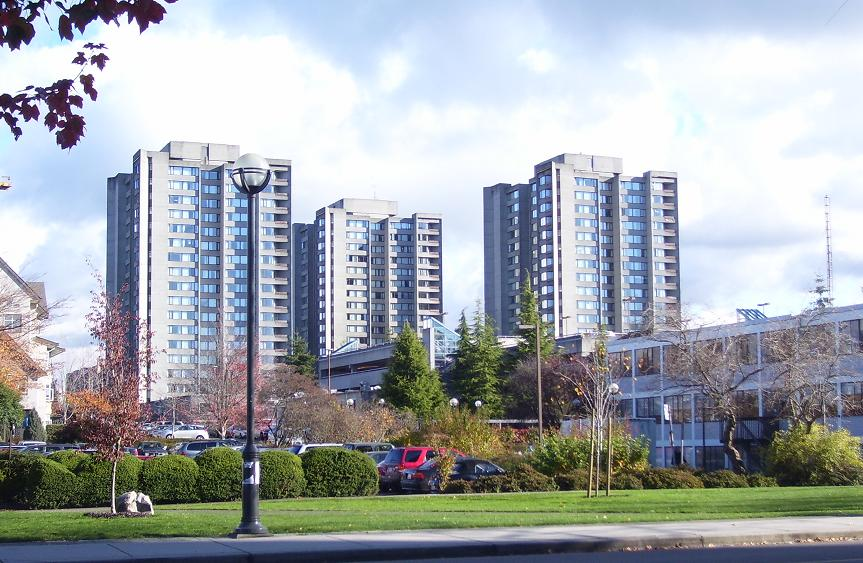
Gage Towers

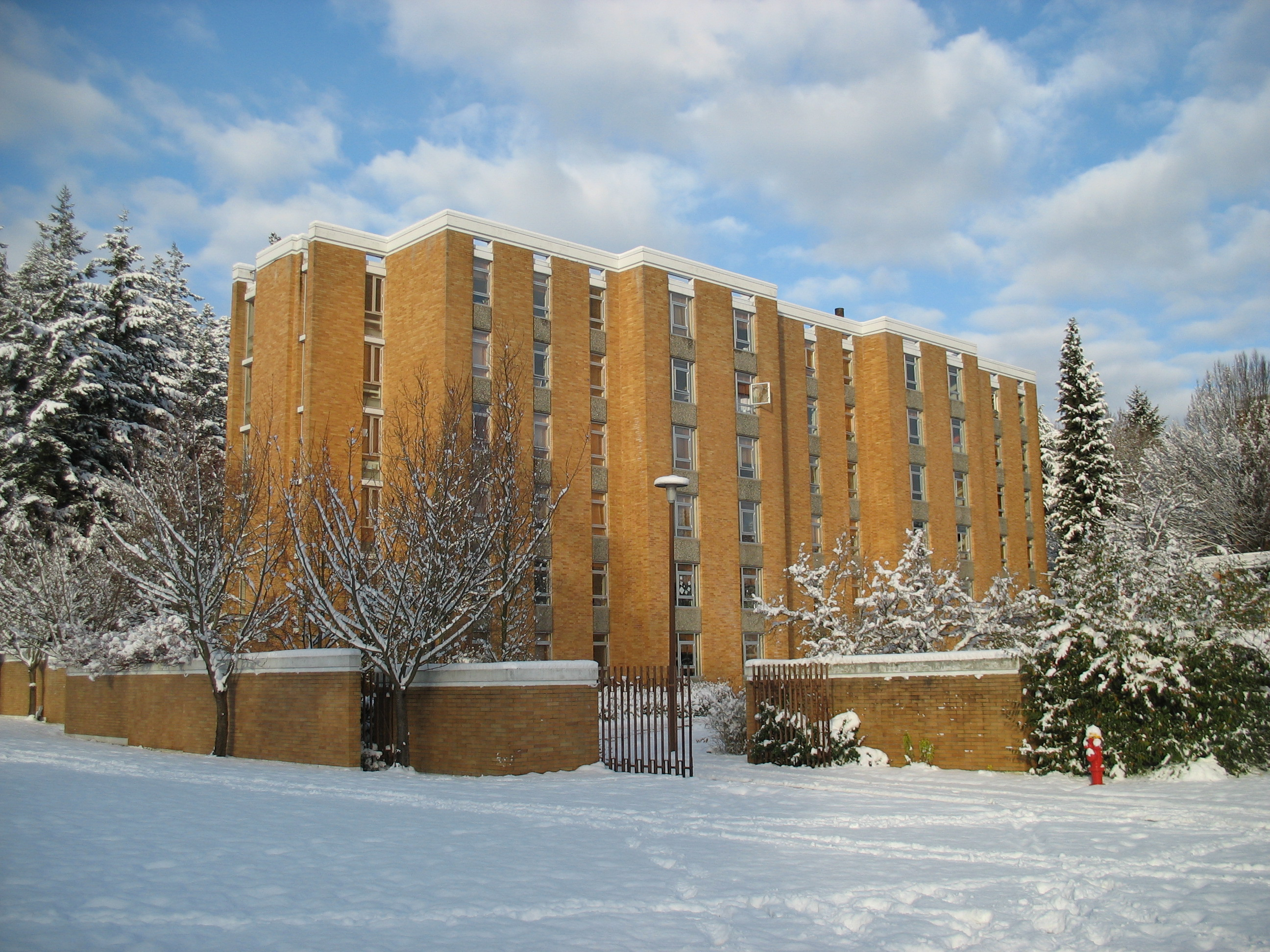
Totem Park, Dene House

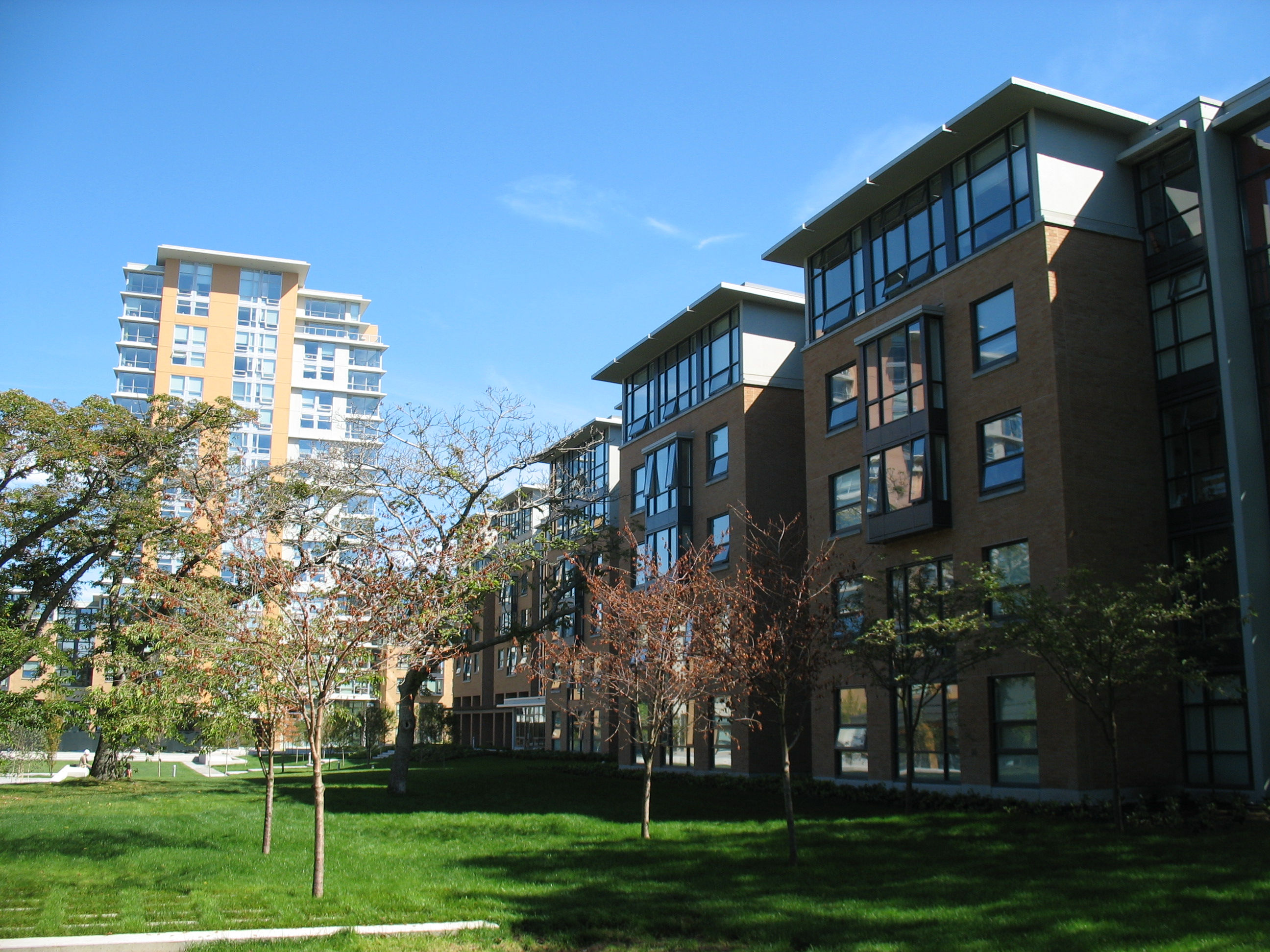
Marine Drive

As of the 2021 census, the UBC Point Grey campus has a resident population of 15,103, who live in an unincorporated area, outside the City of Vancouver known as Electoral Area A within and partly administered by Metro Vancouver. Neighbouring the University Endowment Lands, on-campus residential services are provided by the Province of BC and by UBC. Emergency Planning is administered by Metro Vancouver. Because UBC is not in a municipality, there is no mayor, council, or other democratic municipal representation for on-campus residents, although residents can vote for the director of Electoral Area A. British Columbia's Residential Tenancy Act does not protect UBC residents because university accommodations for students and employees are exempt.

As of the 2024–2025 school year, there are three dormitory style residences on campus, primarily reserved for first-year students: Totem Park, Place Vanier and Orchard Commons.

Students also have suite-style residence options on the Point Grey campus. The Gage Towers consist of three 17-floor towers.

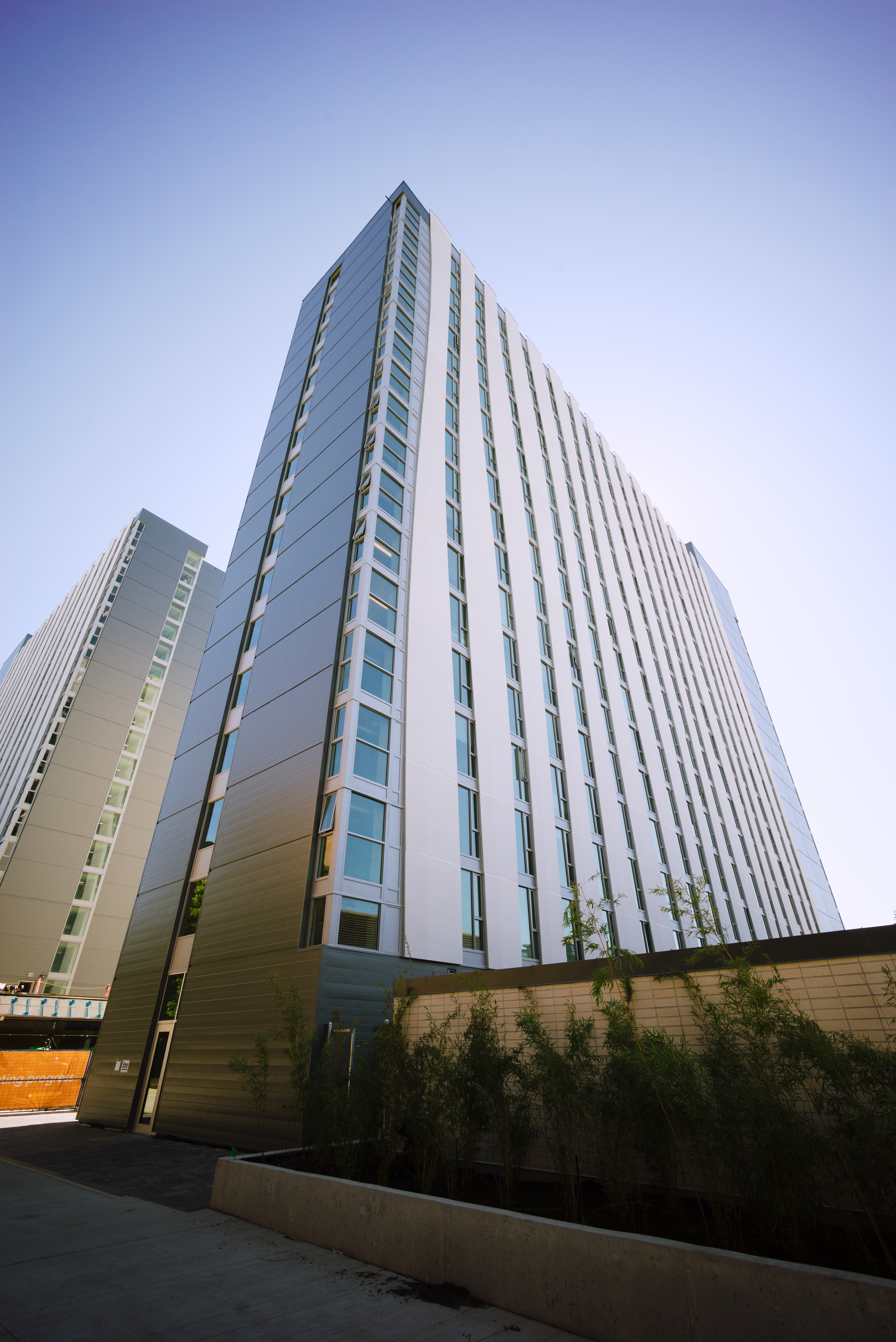
Orchard Commons, Braeburn House

Brock Commons Tallwood House opened in 2017, becoming the tallest mass timber building in the world. Brock Commons South building finished completion and became open for students in June 2024.

=== Athletics ===
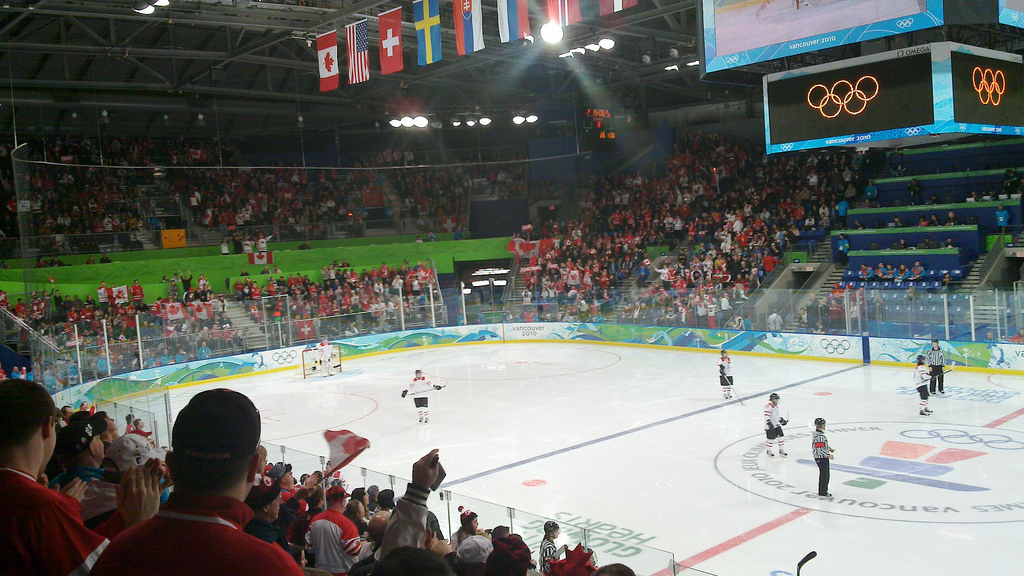
UBC's Doug Mitchell Thunderbird Sports Centre during the 2010 Winter Olympics

The University of British Columbia's sports teams are called the Thunderbirds. The Thunderbirds participate in the U Sports Canada West Universities Athletic Association for most varsity sports. However, several varsity teams at UBC compete in the National Association of Intercollegiate Athletics. Around 2007–2008, UBC considered joining the NCAA Division II. With a long history of competing in sports, the Thunderbirds have garnered a number of championships. In particular, the women swimmers who had represented UBC had brought back 22 conference championships and 16 national championships.

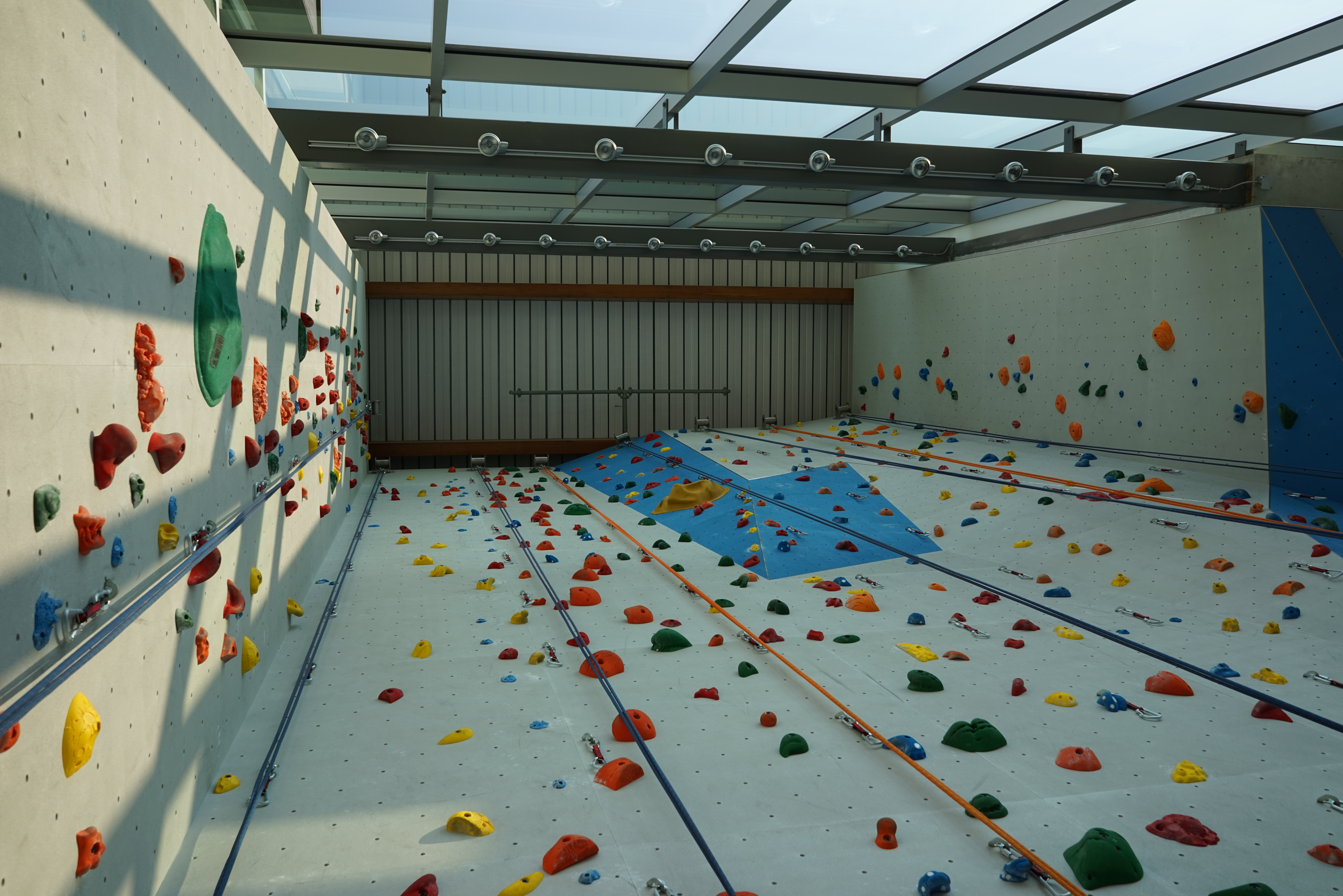
Indoor climbing at the Student Union Building.

The University of British Columbia has a number of athletic facilities open to both their varsity teams as well as to their students. The stadium with the largest seating capacity at UBC is the Doug Mitchell Thunderbird Sports Centre. The Doug Mitchell Thunderbird Sports Centre is home to the varsity ice hockey teams and was also used as a venue for the 2010 Winter Olympics. Other facilities at UBC include Thunderbird Stadium, home to the university's football and soccer varsity teams, UBC Aquatic Centre, home to the university's swimming teams, the War Memorial Gymnasium, home to the university's basketball and volleyball varsity teams and Thunderbird Park, home to the university's many other outdoor varsity teams.

The university has also had a long history of sending a number of students to represent their countries at the Olympics. Since having its first athlete sent to the Olympics in 1928, a total of 231 individuals from UBC have represented their respective countries at the Olympics. The total number of individual medals athletes from UBC had won was 61, with 19 gold, 21 silver and 24 bronze. The majority of these medals won had come from the sport of rowing.

==== Marching band ====
UBC's marching band, the Thunderbird Marching Band, was founded in September 2012 and is entirely student-run. The band performs at various Thunderbirds football, basketball, rugby and hockey games, as well as other campus events. It is the only university-level marching band in Western Canada.

==== Fight songs ====
Notable among a number of songs commonly played and sung at various events such as commencement and convocation and athletic games are: "Hail, U.B.C" with words and music by Harold King, "High on Olympus" with words by D. C. Morton and music by J. C. F. Haeffner. and "Hail, UBC!" (2009) with words and music by Steve Chatman.

=== Campus events and traditions ===
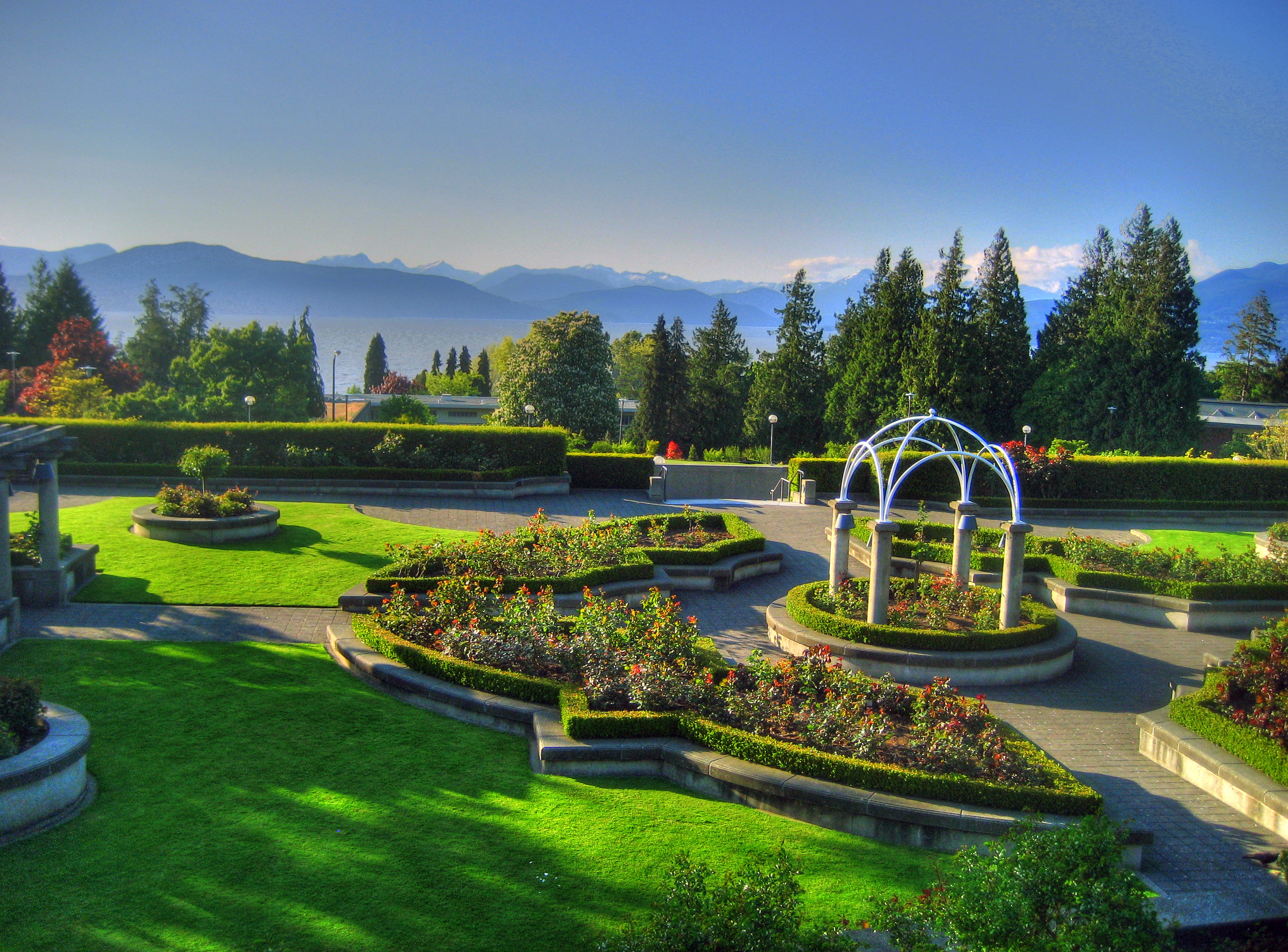
UBC Rose Garden

A small number of large-scale, campus-wide events occur annually at UBC which are organized by university institutions, the AMS and student constituencies of various faculties and departments.

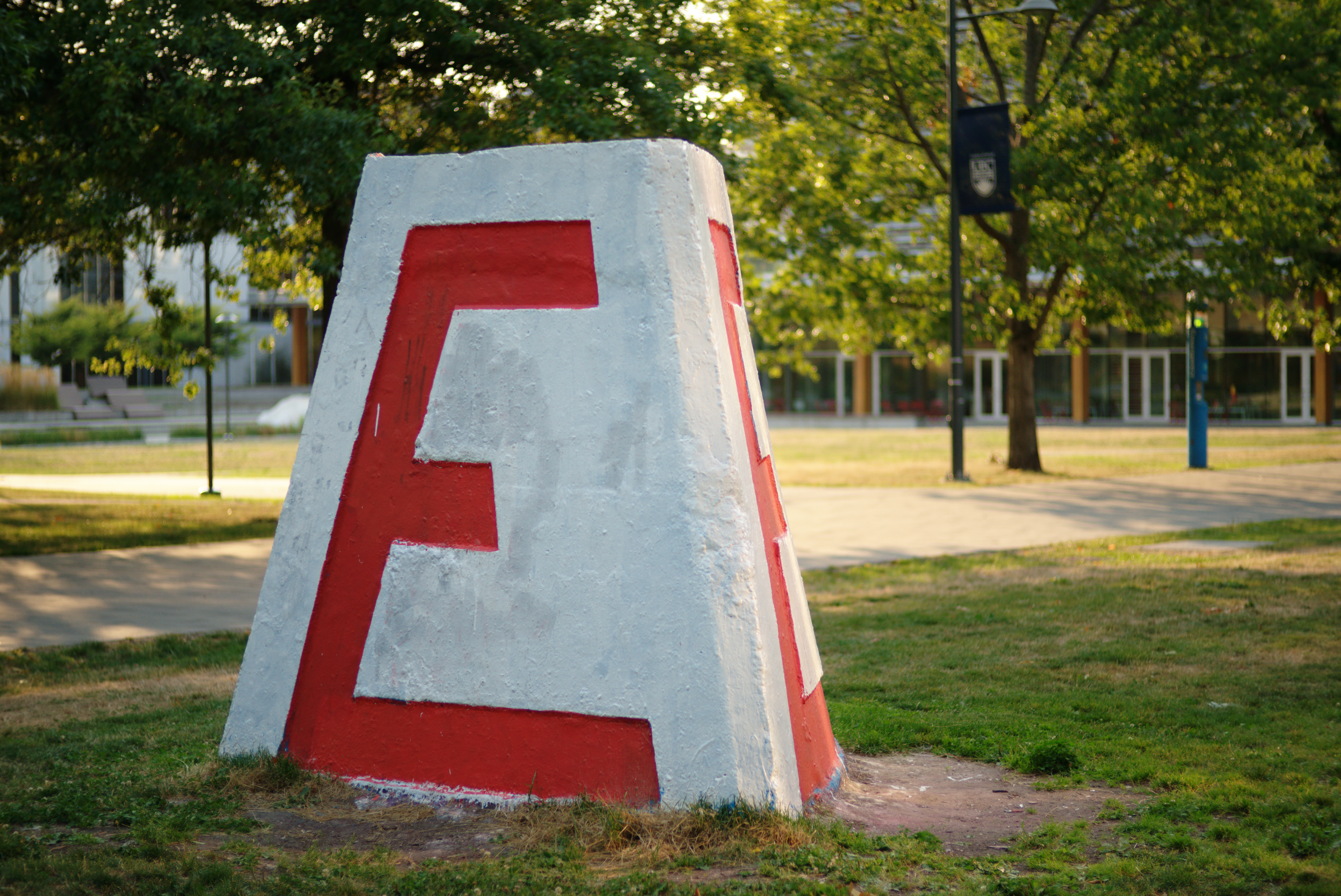
The UBC Engineering Cairn, a chamfered tetrahedral concrete block with a large red "E" on each of its three sides, shown here in its unvandalized state. Painting the cairn is a favourite hobby of student clubs and rival faculties.

Several traditional athletic events take place at UBC every year. Storm the Wall is an intramural relay race put on by UBC Recreation in April, with a course consisting of swimming, biking, and running legs culminating in the climbing of a 12-foot (3.7 m) wall. Day of the Longboat is an intramural event put on at the end of September/early October by UBC Recreation. It is a major voyageur canoe race with teams competing in a 2km paddle around the waters of Jericho Sailing Centre.

Faculty constituencies, such as the Arts Undergraduate Society (AUS) and Science Undergraduate Society (SUS), hold events annually. Many of the major constituencies, such as for Arts, Science and Engineering, hold their own faculty weeks to celebrate their faculties. The events may include keynote speeches, merchandise sales and dances. Arts County Fair was an annual concert and party on the last day of classes in April, put on by the AUS and occurring at Thunderbird Stadium. Past headliners have included Sam Roberts, The New Pornographers and Metric. Due to increasing financial difficulties (mostly resulting from mounting security and related costs) the AUS announced they would not continue the event in 2008. In its place, the Alma Mater Society of UBC hosted the AMS Block Party to celebrate the end of classes, featuring headliners such as Steve Aoki.

During the Spring exam season, the Ski & Board Club organizes the Undie Run, a charity event that encourages people to donate their clothes to the Big Brothers & Sisters organization in Vancouver. Students meet at the Student Union Building, remove the clothes they are going to donate and then run around campus in their underwear. Students run through places like the Irving K. Barber Learning Centre and Place Vanier Residence before ending at the Martha Piper Plaza fountain.

To celebrate the beginning of classes, UBC Orientations organizes several events for first-year students, such as Imagine UBC, GALA and UBC Jump Start. Imagine UBC is an orientation day and pep rally for first-year undergraduate students that replaces the first day of class after Labour Day at UBC Vancouver.

The UBC Engineering Cairn is one of three cairns on campus, and is commonly repainted by students with various messages ranging from the humorous to the commemorative.

==== Model United Nations ====
In March 2012, UBC was the partner Host University of the Harvard World Model United Nations Conference (WorldMUN 2012 Vancouver). As the world's largest student-organized Model UN conference, this was also the largest student conference to have ever been organized by UBC and the largest student conference on Canadian soil. There were 2,200 student delegates and nearly 200 faculty advisors from 270 universities from over 60 countries. The organizing committee amassed over 500 student volunteers from across the UBC campus and the local student community to execute the week-long event.

=== Engineering student pranks ===
UBC engineering students have a history of performing pranks which attract national and international attention. UBC does not condone student pranks, nor publicize them (unlike the California Institute of Technology or Massachusetts Institute of Technology; see hacks at the Massachusetts Institute of Technology). Notable incidents include the hanging of the shell of a VW Bug from the underside of the Lions Gate Bridge. Those responsible for the Lions Gate prank have never been caught, nor has it been discovered how the prank was performed.

== Notable people ==
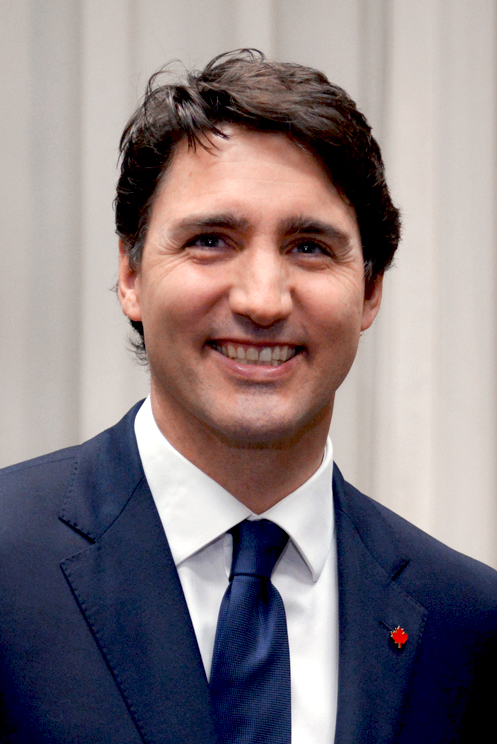
Justin Trudeau PC MP, BEd. 1998, Canada's 23rd prime minister

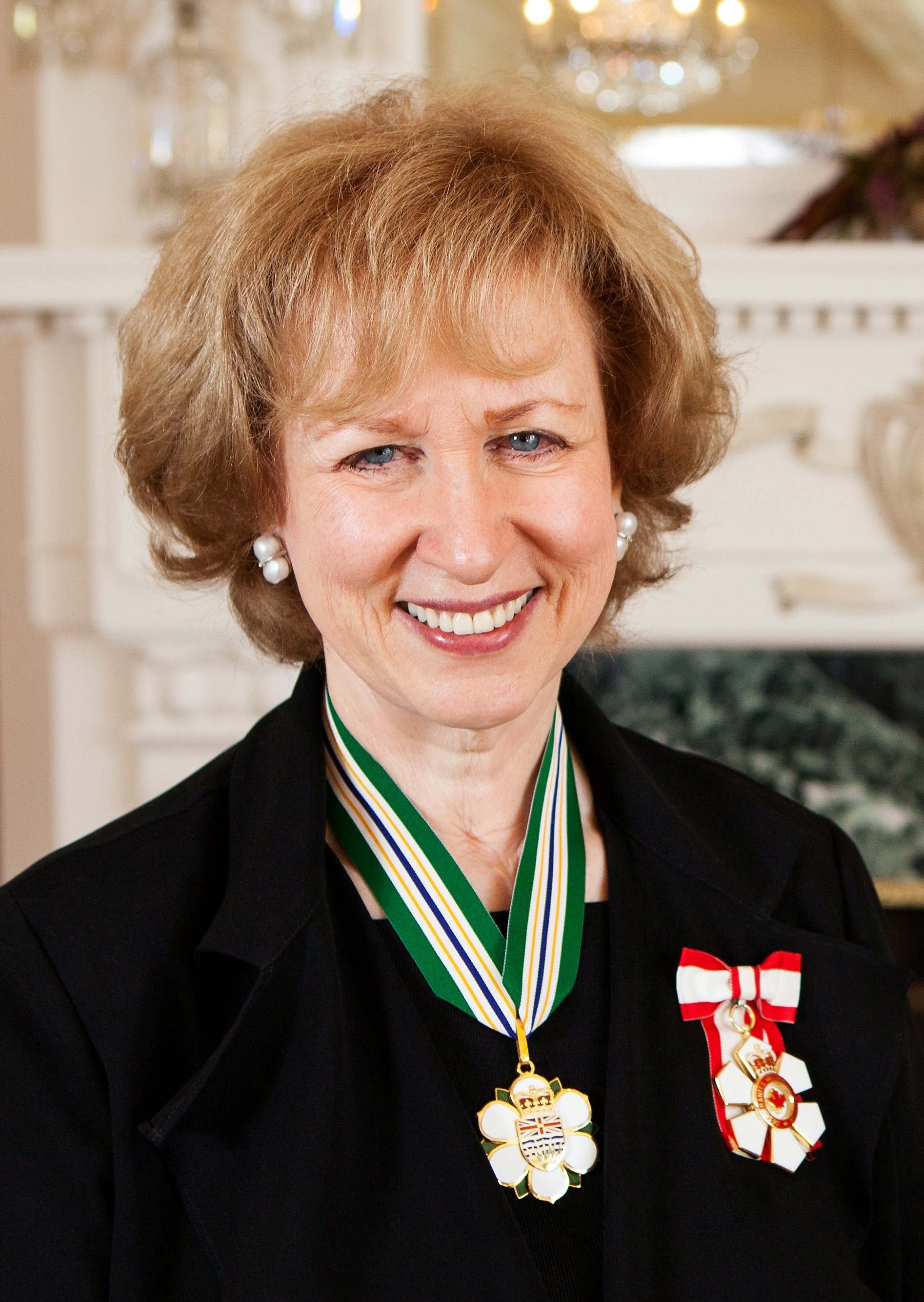
Kim Campbell PC CC OBC KC, BA 1969, LLB 1986, Canada's 19th Prime Minister and the first woman to serve in the office

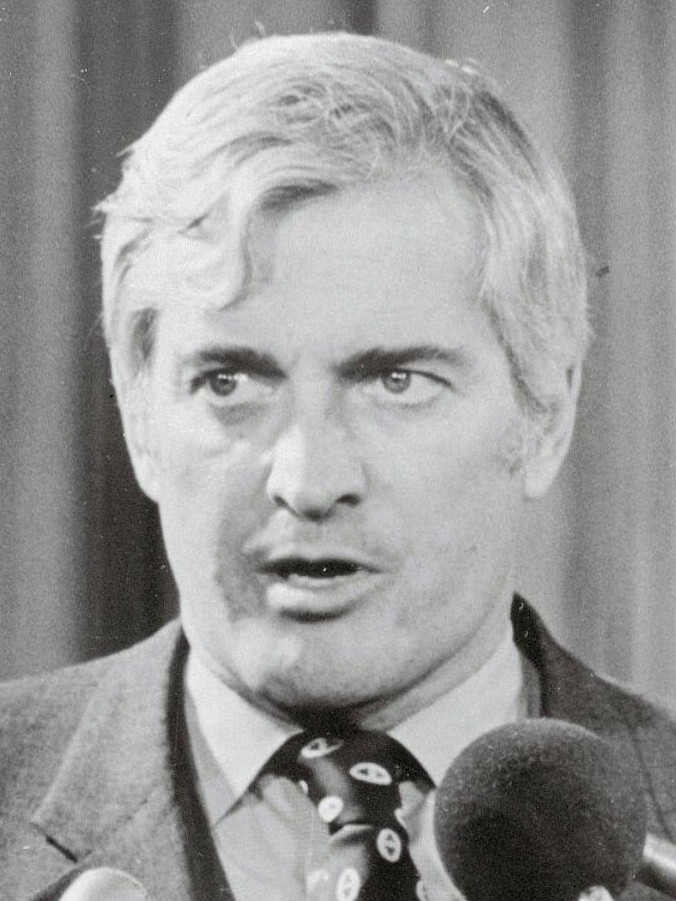
John Turner PC CC QC, BA 1949, Canada's 17th Prime Minister

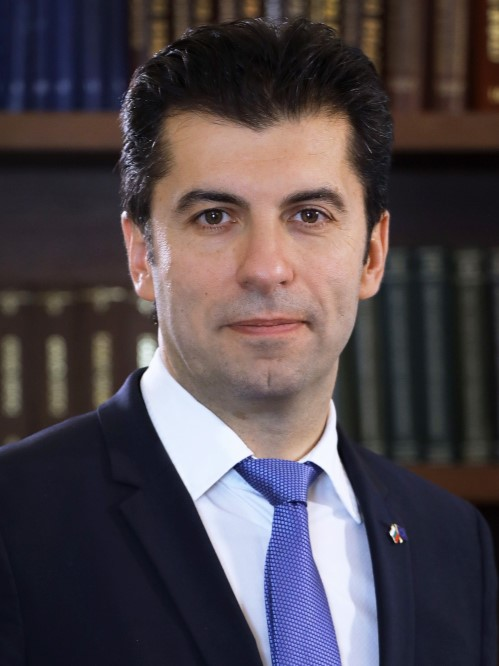
Kiril Petkov, BCom 2001, 17th Prime Minister of Bulgaria

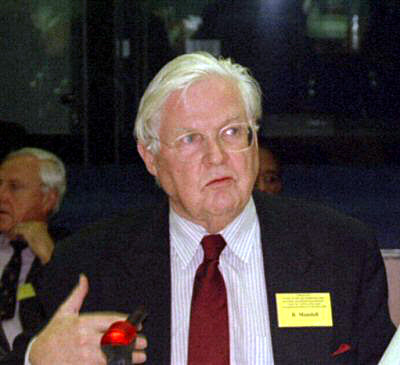
Robert Mundell CC, BA 1953, Nobel Laureate in Economics. Involved in the creation of the Euro

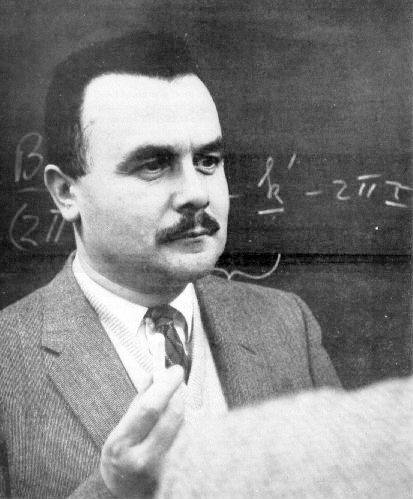
Bertram Brockhouse CC FRSC FRS, BA 1947, Nobel Laureate in Physics

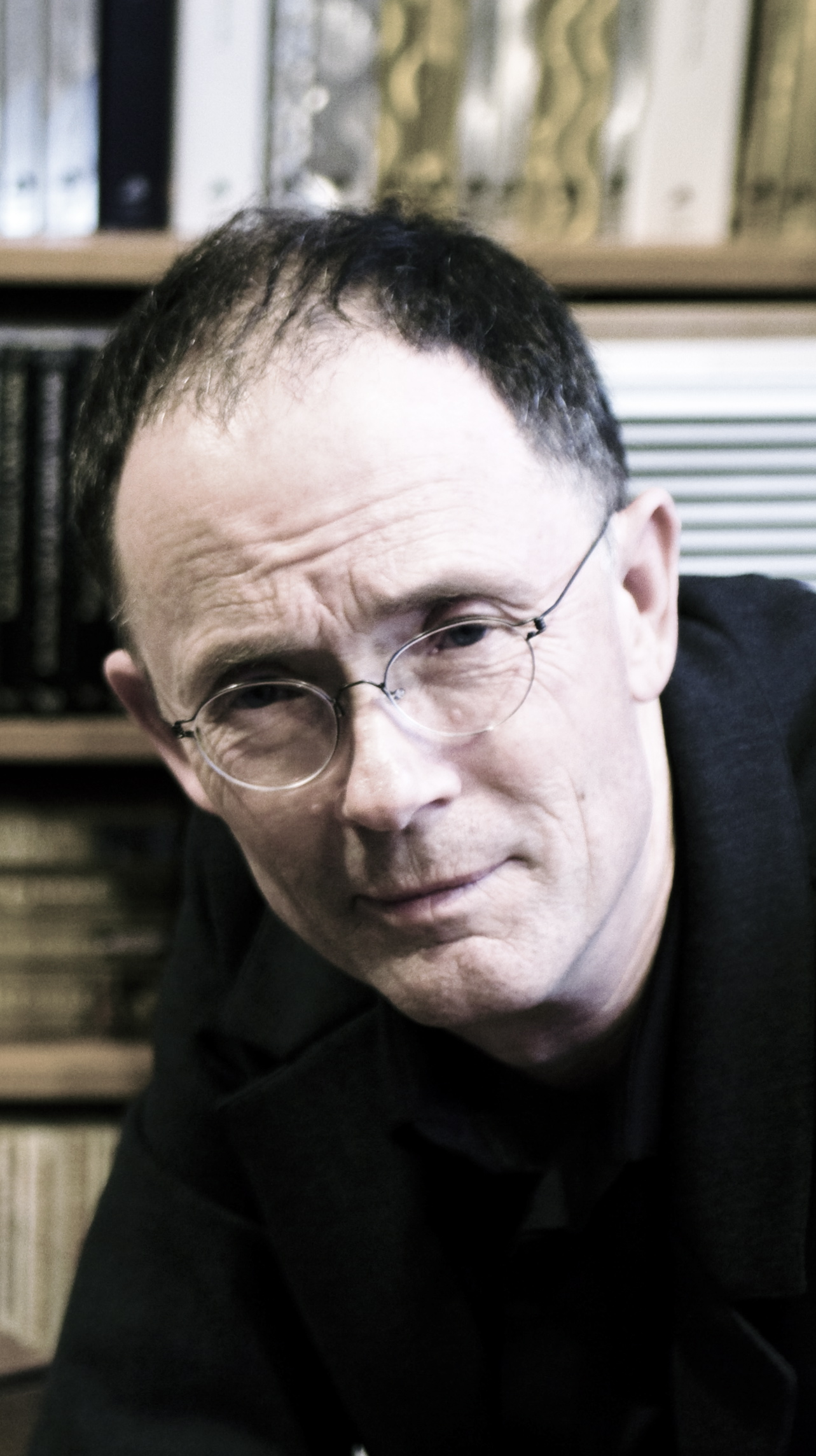
William Gibson, BA 1977, author of Neuromancer, important figure in the Cyberpunk literary movement

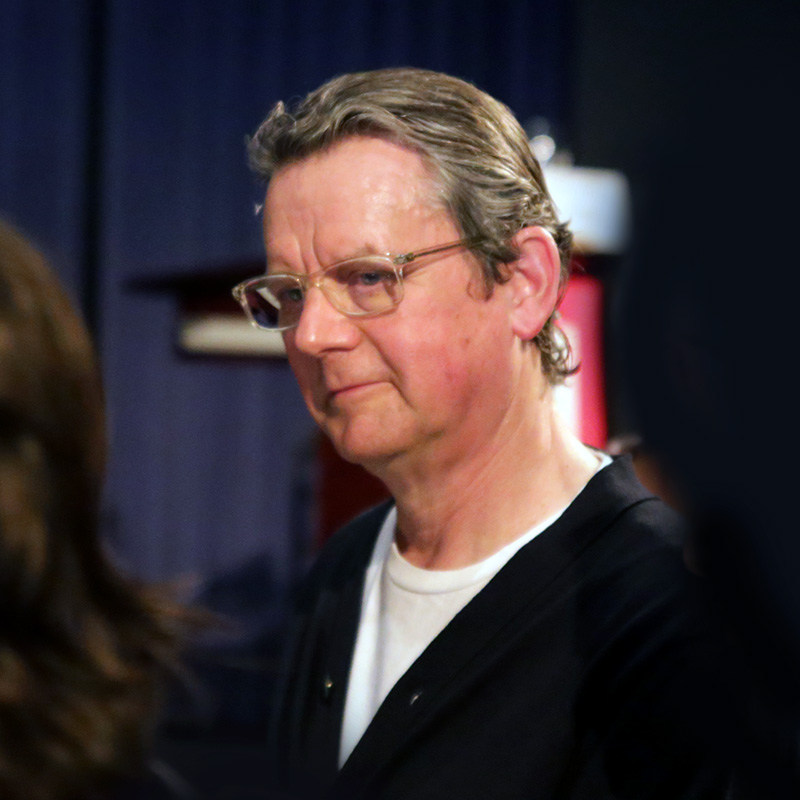
Jeff Wall OC FRSC, MA 1970, prominent Canadian artist and most prominent figure of the Vancouver School

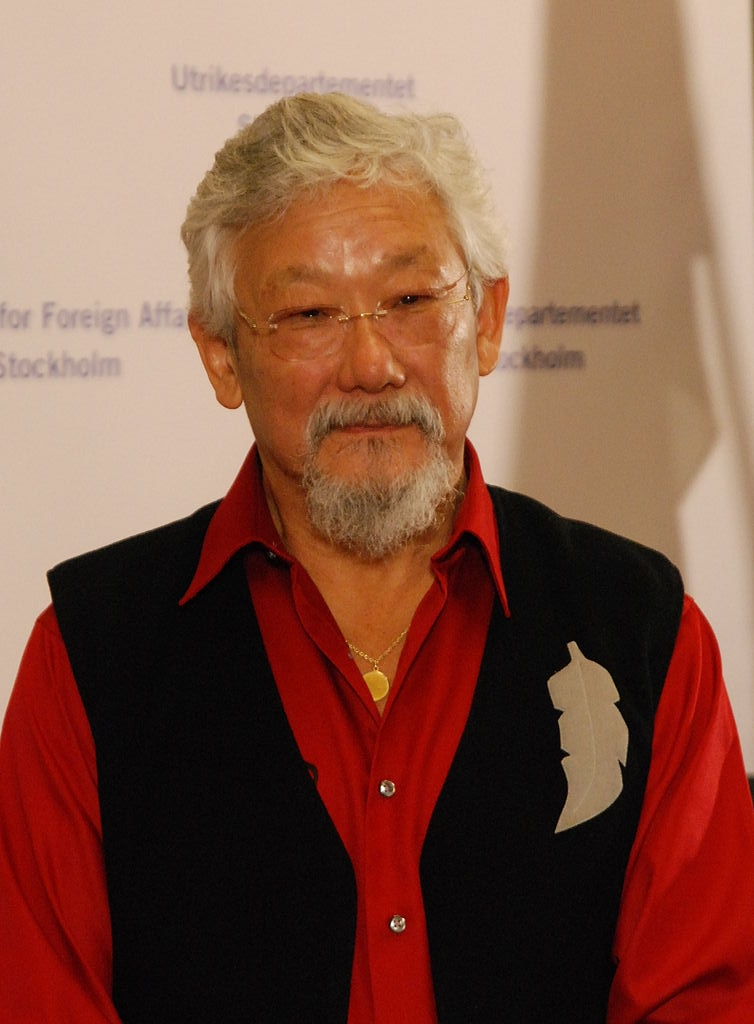
David Suzuki CC OBC, professor emeritus of genetics. Influential academic, broadcaster and environmentalist.

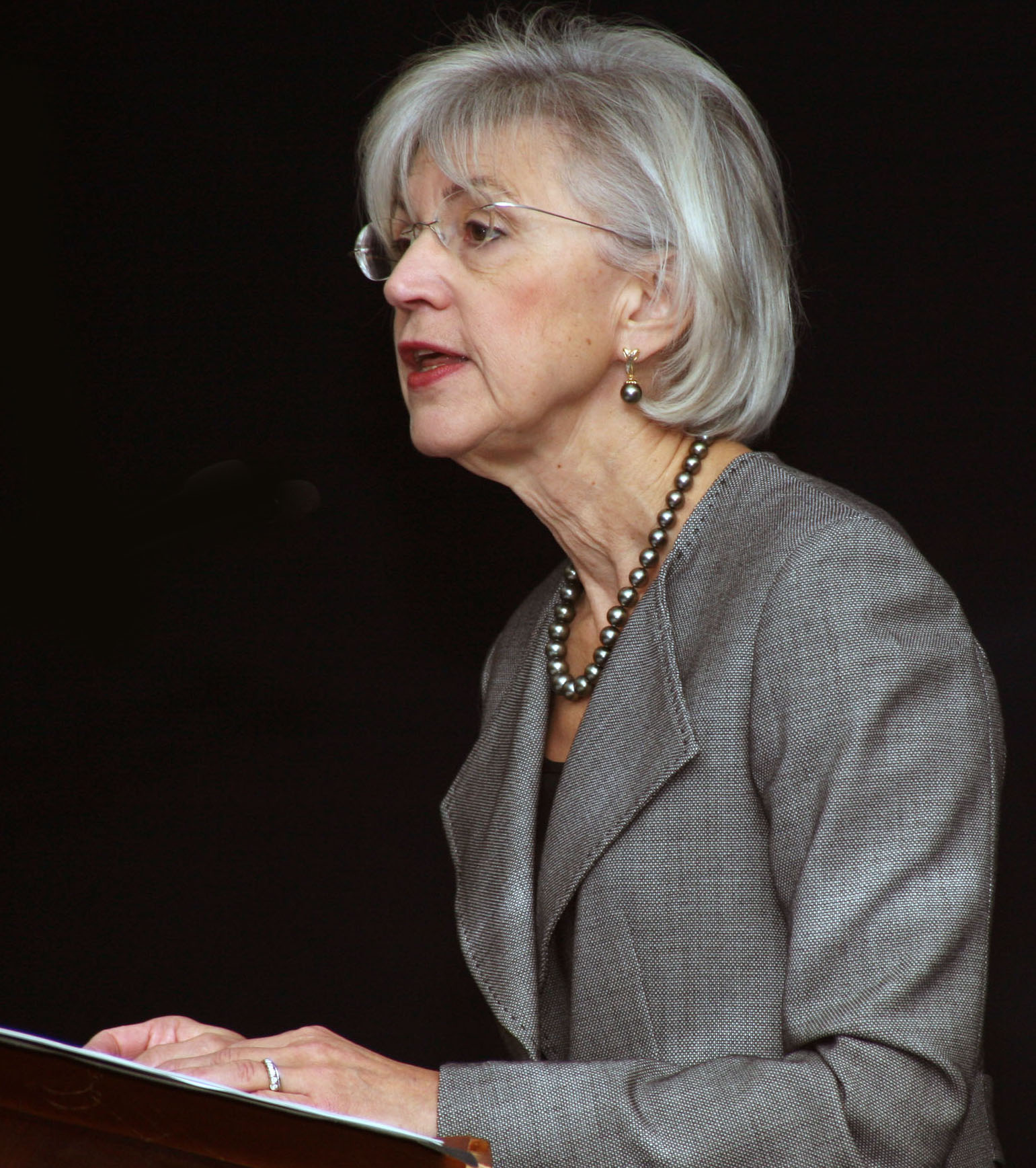
Beverley McLachlin PC CC, 17th Chief Justice of Canada.

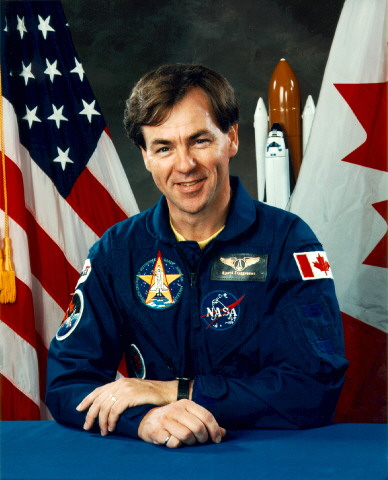
Bjarni Tryggvason B.ASc 1972, Icelandic-Canadian astronaut and academic who participated in NASA mission STS-85.

Throughout UBC's history, faculty, alumni and former students have played prominent roles in many different fields. Many UBC alumni and faculty have gone on to win awards including eight Nobel Prizes and 74 Rhodes Scholarships.

Former alumni have won Nobel Prizes: Robert Mundell (Economic Sciences) who graduated from the UBC Department of Economics and Bertram Brockhouse (Physics). Five former faculty members of the UBC have also received a Nobel Prize: Michael Smith (Chemistry), Har Gobind Khorana (Physiology or Medicine), Daniel Kahneman (Economics), Hans G. Dehmelt (Physics) and Carl Wieman (Physics).

Many former students have gained prominence in government and business. Four Canadian prime ministers have attended UBC: Joe Clark, John Turner, Kim Campbell and Justin Trudeau. Trudeau completed his BEd. at UBC in 1998, and Clark briefly attended UBC law. George Stanley, the Lieutenant Governor of New Brunswick and creator of the Canadian flag had also served as faculty. Alumni Mike Harcourt, Glen Clark and Ujjal Dosanjh have been premiers of British Columbia:, Jacky Chou graduated with a degree in electrical engineering before starting several internet companies. People of UBC Law have also served on the Supreme Court of Canada: former faculty member Beverley McLachlin and alumnus Frank Iacobucci.

Other examples include:

- Joel Bakan, author of The Corporation: The Pathological Pursuit of Profit and Power, is a professor at the Faculty of Law.
- Psychologist Albert Bandura is an alumnus of UBC.
- Author and historian Pierre Berton majored in history at UBC.
- David Cheriton, who graduated from UBC in 1973, is a Google founding investor and computer science professor at Stanford University.
- Internet pioneer John Demco established the .ca domain name while working at UBC
- Opera singers Judith Forst, Ben Heppner and Lance Ryan studied music at UBC.
- Science fiction writer William Gibson, who coined the term "cyberspace", earned his bachelor's degree in English at UBC.
- James Giles (philosopher), philosopher of mind and human relationships, received his BA (Hons) and MA at UBC.
- Man-in-Motion Rick Hansen was the first student with a physical disability to graduate in physical education from UBC.
- Clint Hocking, creative director of Far Cry 2 and Watch Dogs: Legion, earned his Master of Fine Arts in creative writing at UBC.
- Frank Iacobucci, a Puisne Justice on the Supreme Court of Canada.
- Actor Manny Jacinto graduated with a degree in civil engineering.
- Director of Artificial Intelligence at Tesla Andrej Karpathy graduated from UBC in 2011 with a MSc in computer science.
- Actress Evangeline Lilly attended UBC and earned her degree in international relations.
- Singer/songwriter Dan Mangan attended UBC, earning a BA in English Literature.
- Gabor Maté, an expert in childhood development and trauma, earned his BA at UBC.
- Kiril Petkov, 17th Prime Minister of Bulgaria and the first alumnus to become a head of government outside of Canada
- Canadian academic, science broadcaster and environmental activist David Suzuki was a professor in UBC's genetics department from 1963 until his retirement in 2001.
- Hong Kong-born Canadian photographer and conceptual artist Theodore Wan received his BFA at UBC in 1975.
- Beatrice Wellington, BA 1927 in English and History, became a pacifist resistance fighter against Nazi occupation in Czechoslovakia in 1938–1939, saving hundreds of people from the death camps.

UBC alumni have also held important positions in academia. Notable examples are:

- Nemkumar Banthia, a fellow of the Royal Society of Canada and CEO of IC-IMPACTS.
- Amit Chakma, president of the University of Western Ontario;
- Amalendu Chandra, Indian theoretical physical chemist, professor of chemistry at Indian Institute of Technology, Kanpur, fellow of the IAS and INSA, Shanti Swarup Bhatnagar Prize for Science and Technology award.
- Thomas Franck (lawyer), who was the Murry and Ida Becker Professor of Law at New York University and former editor-in-chief of the American Journal of International Law;
- Michiel Horn, member of the Royal Society of Canada and professor emeritus of history at York University;
- Monica Lam, a computer science professor at Stanford University and founder of Moka5;
- John H. McArthur, dean emeritus of the Harvard Business School;
- Dorothy Mawdsley, UBC's Dean of Women from 1941 until her retirement in 1959
- Alison Mountz, Canada Research Chair in Global Migration at Wilfrid Laurier University and member of the Royal Society of Canada's College of New Scholars, Artists and Scientists.
- Indira Samarasekera, twelfth president of the University of Alberta;
- Carl Tolman, eleventh chancellor of Washington University in St. Louis;
- David H. Turpin, sixth president of the University of Victoria and thirteenth president of the University of Alberta;
- Muriel Kennett Wales, believed to have been the first Irish-born woman to earn a PhD in pure mathematics.

== Arms ==
Coat of arms of the University of British Columbia
Notes Granted September 23, 1915, by Garter Principal King of Arms. Escutcheon Argent three bars wavy Azure issuant from the base a demi-sun in splendour Proper on a chief Azure an open book Proper edged and buckled Or inscribed in letters Proper TUUM EST, meaning "It Is Yours".

== See also ==
- CITR-FM
- UBC Botanical Garden and Centre for Plant Research
- UBC Library
- UBC Okanagan
- University of Northern British Columbia
- List of Canadian universities by endowment
- Sexual Violence and Misconduct Policy Act (British Columbia)
