= Leonard Klinck =

Leonard S. Klinck
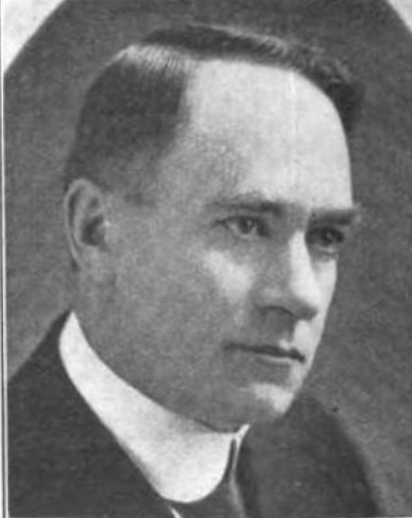

Second President of University of British Columbia
- In office 1919–1940
- Preceded by: Frank Wesbrook
- Succeeded by: Norman MacKenzie

Personal details
- Born: Leonard Sylvanus Klinck; January 20, 1877 Victoria Place, Ontario, Canada
- Died: March 27, 1969 (aged 92)
- Education: Ontario Agricultural College; Iowa State University
- Profession: Professor of agricultural science

Leonard Sylvanus Klinck (January 20, 1877 – March 27, 1969) was the second president of the University of British Columbia in Vancouver, British Columbia, Canada from 1919 to 1940.

== Biography ==
Leonard Klinck was born in Victoria Square, Ontario in 1877. He graduated from the Ontario Agricultural College in 1903, and received a Master of Science in Agriculture from Iowa State University in 1905. He then taught at the Macdonald College at McGill University.

Klinck was appointed Dean of Agriculture in 1914. He set to work clearing 150 acres at Point Grey, preparing it for University usage. An archive photograph shows him at a small shed, the first building on the site, displaying a Danger sign. Evidently it was used to store explosives used in the work. But it would be a decade before the site was occupied by students.

Frank Wesbrook and Leonard Klinck toured the Okanagan, visiting orchards, packing houses, and horse and cattle ranches. Their trip took them through Salmon Arm, Vernon, Coldstream, Lumby, Kelowna, Summerland and Penticton. In 1915 Klinck, Wesbrook, and Dean of Applied Science R. W. Brock, met with the premier in Victoria to discuss the amount of provincial support for the envisioned institution. The skeleton of a science building was erected at Point Grey, but the contractor had underbid the costs and went bankrupt, leaving the building unfinished. Klinck was called upon to estimate the cost of completion.

When Wesbrook fell ill, he wrote his colleague:

My dear Dean Klinck: In order to expedite the business of the University and to cause as little inconvenience as possible to the Board of Governors, and the members of the staff and the student body, … you [are] asked to serve… as acting President.

In July 1919 Klinck was appointed president. In a later reflection, when he lectured on the principles of administration, he lamented that service in the office of university president entailed "sacrifice of opportunities for acquiring a mastery in any recognized department of learning." Nevertheless, Klinck continued his activity with the Society of Technical Agriculturists.

Klinck had the attitude that the university should be modest in profile before the public:

The love of large dimensions, the temptation to keep prominently before the public the material and visible accomplishments of the University, must be withstood constantly and resolutely.
