= List of McMaster University people =

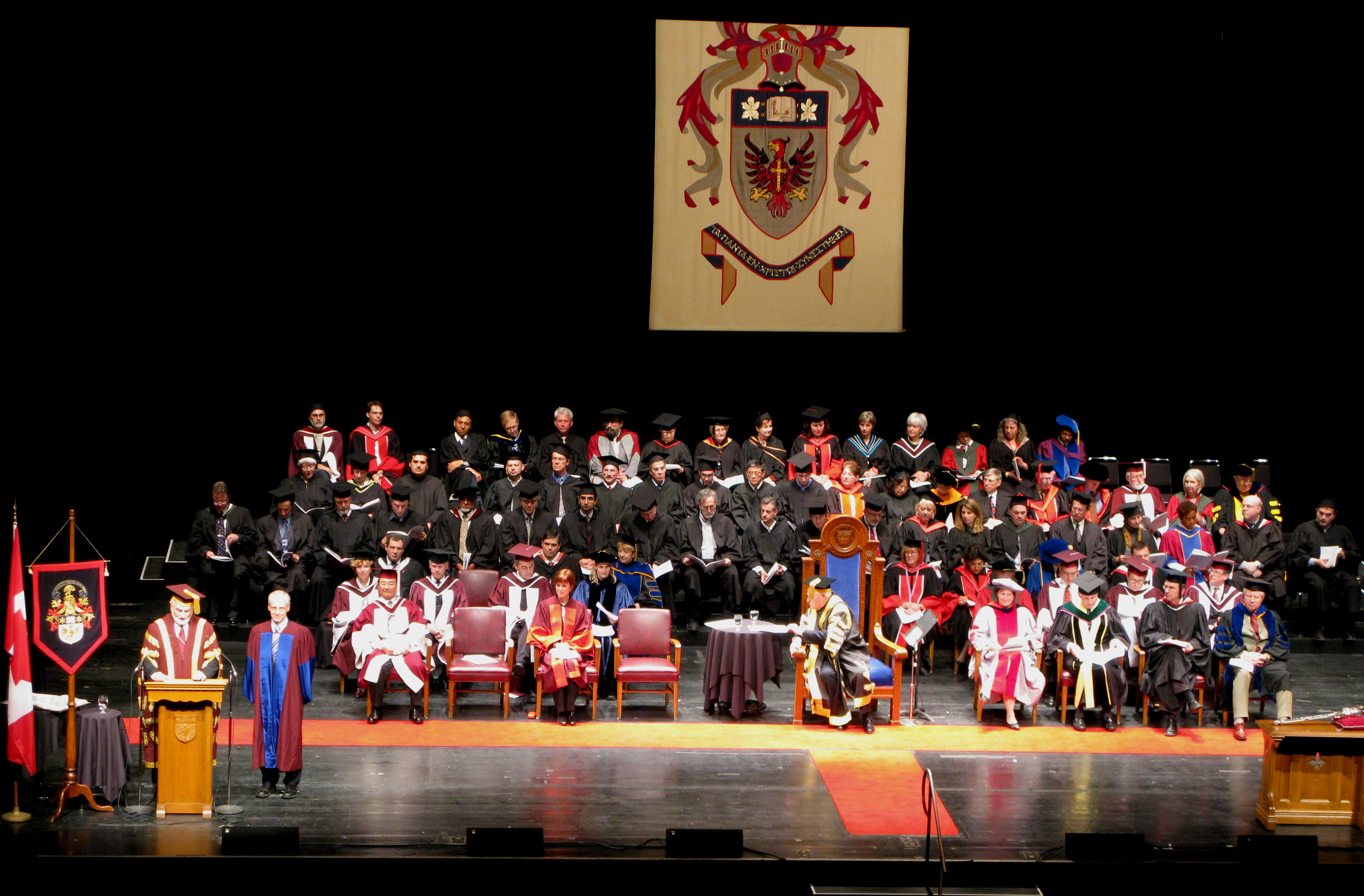
The 448th Convocation for the Conferring of Degrees at McMaster University

McMaster University, located in Hamilton, Ontario, Canada, is a public research university that was founded in 1887 through funds bequeathed by Canadian Senator William McMaster. It has grown into an institution of more than 32,000 students, faculty, and staff. This list includes faculty, alumni and staff.

== Notable alumni ==
Fields with a — have unknown values.

=== Academia and research ===
==== Educators ====
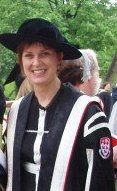
Heather Munroe-Blum

Name	Relationship	Discipline	Notability	Reference
Bobby William Austin	Graduate	Sociology	Vice president for University Relations and Communications at the University of the District of Columbia	
Robert C. Dynes	Graduate	Physics	President of the University of California system	
Fred Longstaffe	Graduate	Geology	Provost and vice-president of Academics at University of Western Ontario	
Heather Munroe-Blum	Undergraduate	Social Work	Principal and vice-chancellor of McGill University	
Howard Petch	Undergraduate	Political Science & Sociology	President and vice-chancellor of the University of Victoria	
David Chadwick Smith	Undergraduate	Economics	Principal and vice-chancellor of Queen's University at Kingston	
Mark Wainwright	Graduate	Chemical Engineering	President and vice-chancellor of University of New South Wales	

==== Professors and researchers ====
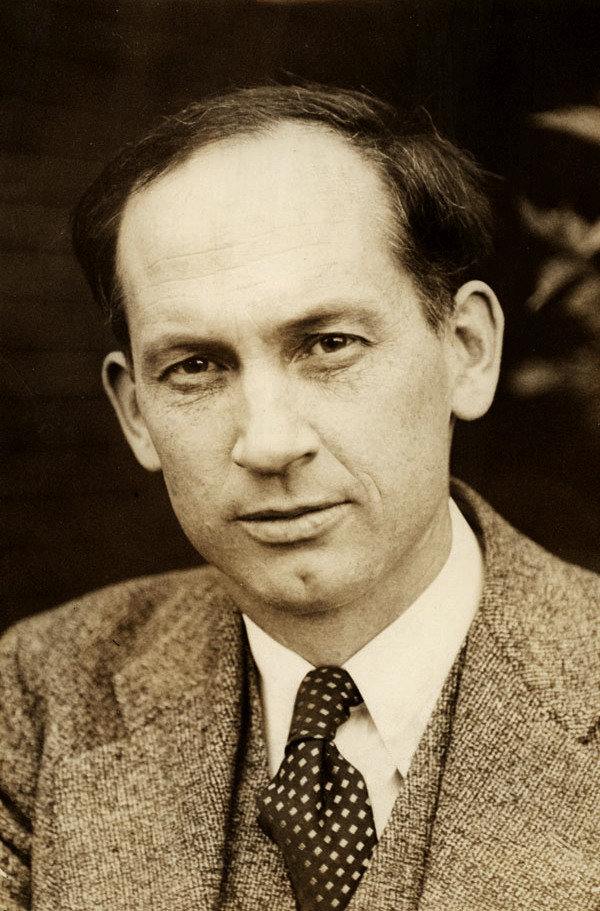
Harold Innis

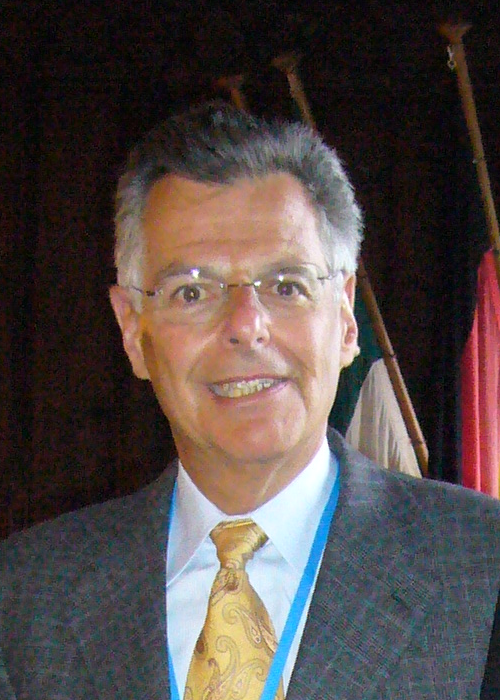
Myron Scholes

Name	Relationship	Discipline	Notability	Reference
Richard Alexander Arnold	Graduate	English Literature	Eminent professor and chair of English at Alfaisal University, literary theorist, author	
Richard Bader	Graduate	Chemistry	Professor at McMaster University, noted for his work on the atoms in molecules approach	
David G. Benner	Undergraduate	Psychology	Founding chair of Graduate Department of Psychological Studies at Wheaton College; chair of the Department of Psychology, Redeemer University College; author on pastoral counselling	
Kathryn Brush	Undergraduate	Art History	Distinguished professor of art history at the University of Western Ontario and Fellow of the Royal Society of Canada	
Lindsay Cahill	Graduate	Chemistry	Professor at the Memorial University of Newfoundland	
David Castle	Graduate	Philosophy	Professor and chair of Innovations in the Life Sciences at University of Edinburgh	
Karl Clark	Graduate	Chemistry	Professor at the University of Alberta, chemist and oil sands researcher	
Ronald C. Davidson	Undergraduate	Physics	Director of Princeton Plasma Physics Laboratory, professor of Princeton University, University of Maryland, Massachusetts Institute of Technology	
Patricia Demers	Graduate	English & French	Chair of Department of Graduate Studies at University of Alberta; first female president of the Royal Society of Canada	
Jacqueline Dias	Undergraduate	Nursing	Nurudin Jivraj Assistant Professor of Nursing and director of the Bachelor of Science in Nursing programme at the Aga Khan University, Karachi, Pakistan	
Marianne Ferber	Graduate	Economics	Professor of Economics at the University of Illinois at Urbana-Champaign	
Meric Gertler	Undergraduate	Geography	Professor and 16th president of the University of Toronto	
Michael Frank Goodchild	Graduate	Geography	Professor at the University of California, Santa Barbara and University of Western Ontario	
Martin Green	Graduate	—	Professor at the University of New South Wales	
Frank Hawthorne	Graduate	Geology	Professor at University of Manitoba, mineralogist and crystallographer	
Harold Innis	Graduate	History & Political Economics	Professor at University of Toronto, helped shaped communication theory and staples thesis	
Lorraine Janzen Kooistra	Graduate	English	Professor at Ryerson University, elected fellow of the Royal Society of Canada	
Harold E. Johns	Undergraduate	Math and Physics	Professor at University of Saskatchewan and University of Toronto, pioneered the use of cobalt-60 in the treatment of cancer, member of the Canadian Medical Hall of Fame and officer of the Order of Canada	
Stephen A. Kent	Graduate	Religious Studies	Professor at the University of Alberta	
Rainer Knopff	Undergraduate	Sociology	Professor at the University of Calgary	
Bartha Knoppers	Undergraduate	English Literature & French	Professor at McGill University, chairman of the International Ethics Committee of the Human Genome Project	
Steve Mann	Graduate	Engineering	Professor at the University of Toronto	
John Mighton	Graduate	Philosophy	Professor at the University of Toronto, author	
Paul Morris	Graduate	Religious Studies	Program director and professor for Religious Studies at Victoria University of Wellington, author of the National Statement on Religious Diversity	
Kathryn Mary Murphy	Professor	Psychology	Professor at McMaster University	
Evelyn Nelson	Graduate	Mathematics	Professor at McMaster University, mathematician	
Adele Reinhartz	Graduate	Religious Studies	Professor at the University of Ottawa	
Thomas G. Rosenmeyer	Undergraduate	Classics	Professor at the University of California, Berkeley	
John Ruggie	Graduate	Business and Human Rights	Berthold Beitz Professor in Human Rights and International Affairs at the Harvard Kennedy School and an affiliated professor in International Legal Studies at Harvard Law School	
Michael Ruse	Graduate	Philosophy	Professor at Florida State University	
Filippo Sabetti	Undergraduate	History & Political Science	Professor at McGill University	
David Scheffel	Graduate	Anthropology	Professor at Thompson Rivers University	
Myron Scholes	Undergraduate	Economics	Professor at Stanford University, Nobel laureate in economics	
Anupam Sen	Graduate	Political Economy	Vice-chancellor of Premier University, Chittagong, Ekushey Padak recipient	
Donna Strickland	Undergraduate	Engineering	Nobel Prize recipient	
Scott Tremaine	Undergraduate	Physics	Professor at University of Toronto and Princeton University, credited with coining the name "Kuiper belt"	
Y-Dang Troeung	Graduate	English and Cultural Studies	Professor at University of British Columbia, specializing in critical refugee studies, critical disability studies, and transnational Asian studies	

=== Business ===
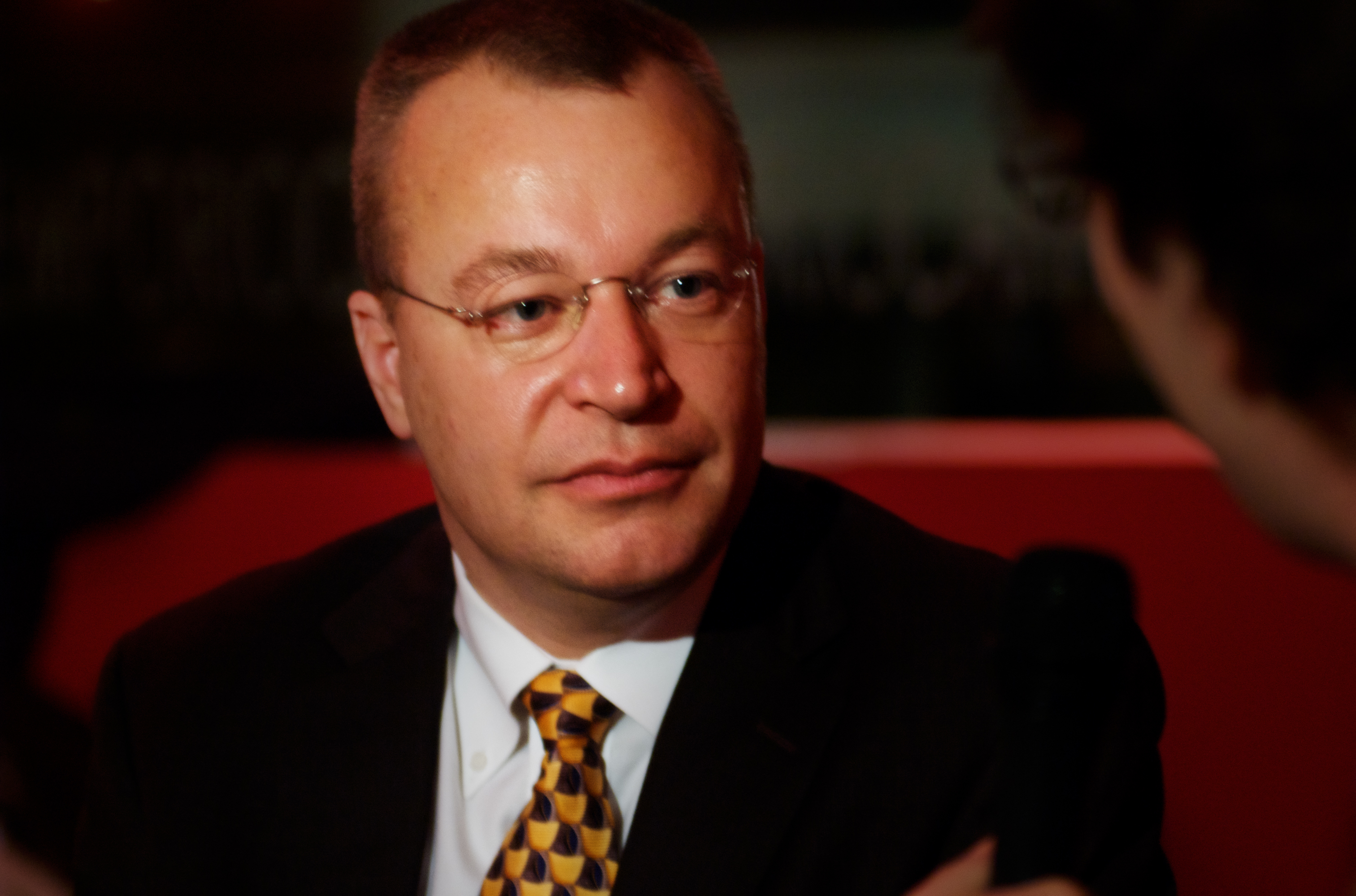
Stephen Elop

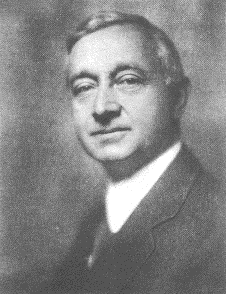
Cyrus S. Eaton

Name	Relationship	Discipline	Notability	Reference
Kathy Bardswick	Graduate	Business	President and CEO of The Co-operators Group	
Rob Burgess	Undergraduate	Business	Chairman and CEO of Macromedia, Director of Adobe Systems	
Cyrus S. Eaton	Undergraduate	Business & Philosophy	Investment banker, businessman and philanthropist	
Stephen Elop	Undergraduate	Business & Engineering	President and CEO of Nokia	
Arthur Fogel	Undergraduate	Arts	Concert promoter and executive at Live Nation Entertainment	
Margaret Franklin	Undergraduate	Business & Economics	President and CEO of CFA Institute	
Paul D. House	Undergraduate	Economics	Executive chairman of Tim Hortons	
Evan Jones	Undergraduate	Arts & Science	Owner of Stich Media	
Michael Lee-Chin	Undergraduate	Engineering	Chairman and CEO of AIC Limited	
Dan MacKenzie	Undergraduate	Commerce	Canadian sports and marketing executive	
Vince Molinaro	Graduate	Education	Leadership consultant, public speaker, and New York Times bestselling author	
Jeffrey Remedios	Undergraduate	Commerce	CEO of Universal Music Canada	
Sarah Thompson	Undergraduate	English & Philosophy	CEO and publisher of Women's Post	
Lynton Wilson	Undergraduate	Economics	Chairman of Nortel	

=== Entertainment ===
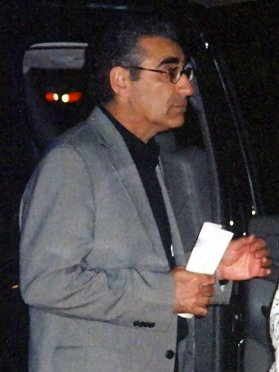
Eugene Levy

Name	Relationship	Discipline	Notability	Reference
Akintoye	Graduate	Commerce	Rapper and TikTok personality	
Imane Anys	Undergraduate	Chemical Engineering	Internet personality and Twitch streamer	
Matthew Barber	Graduate	Philosophy	Singer, songwriter	
Len Blum	Undergraduate	—	Film producer, film composer, screenwriter	
John Candy	Undergraduate	—	Actor, comedian	
Kate Drummond	Graduate	TV & Film	Actress, writer, director	
Jay Firestone	Undergraduate	Business	Film, television producer	
Jonathan Frid	Undergraduate	Film	Actor	
Doug Henning	Undergraduate	Psychology	Magician, illusionist, escape artist and politician	
Max Kerman	Undergraduate	—	Musician, Arkells	
Lisa Langlois	—	—	Actress	
Eugene Levy	Undergraduate	Engineering	Actor, television director, producer, musician, writer	
Andy Maize	Undergraduate	—	Musician, Skydiggers	
Ivan Reitman	Undergraduate	Music	Director and film producer	
John Sessions	Graduate	English	Actor and comedian	
Martin Short	Undergraduate	Social Work	Comedian, actor, writer, singer and producer	
Adam Smoluk	Undergraduate	Business Administration	Screenwriter, film director and actor	
Dave Thomas	Undergraduate	English Literature	Comedian and actor	

=== Journalism and media ===
Name	Relationship	Discipline	Notability	Reference
Peter Calamai	Undergraduate	Physics	Science journalist and member of the Order of Canada	
Gary Lautens	Undergraduate	History	Columnist and humorist for the Toronto Star	
Margaret Lyons	Undergraduate	Economics	CBC Radio executive and first female vice president of the CBC	
Lawrence Martin	Undergraduate	Political Science	Colmunist for The Globe and Mail, author	
Paula Newton	Graduate	Business	International correspondent for CNN	

=== Literature ===
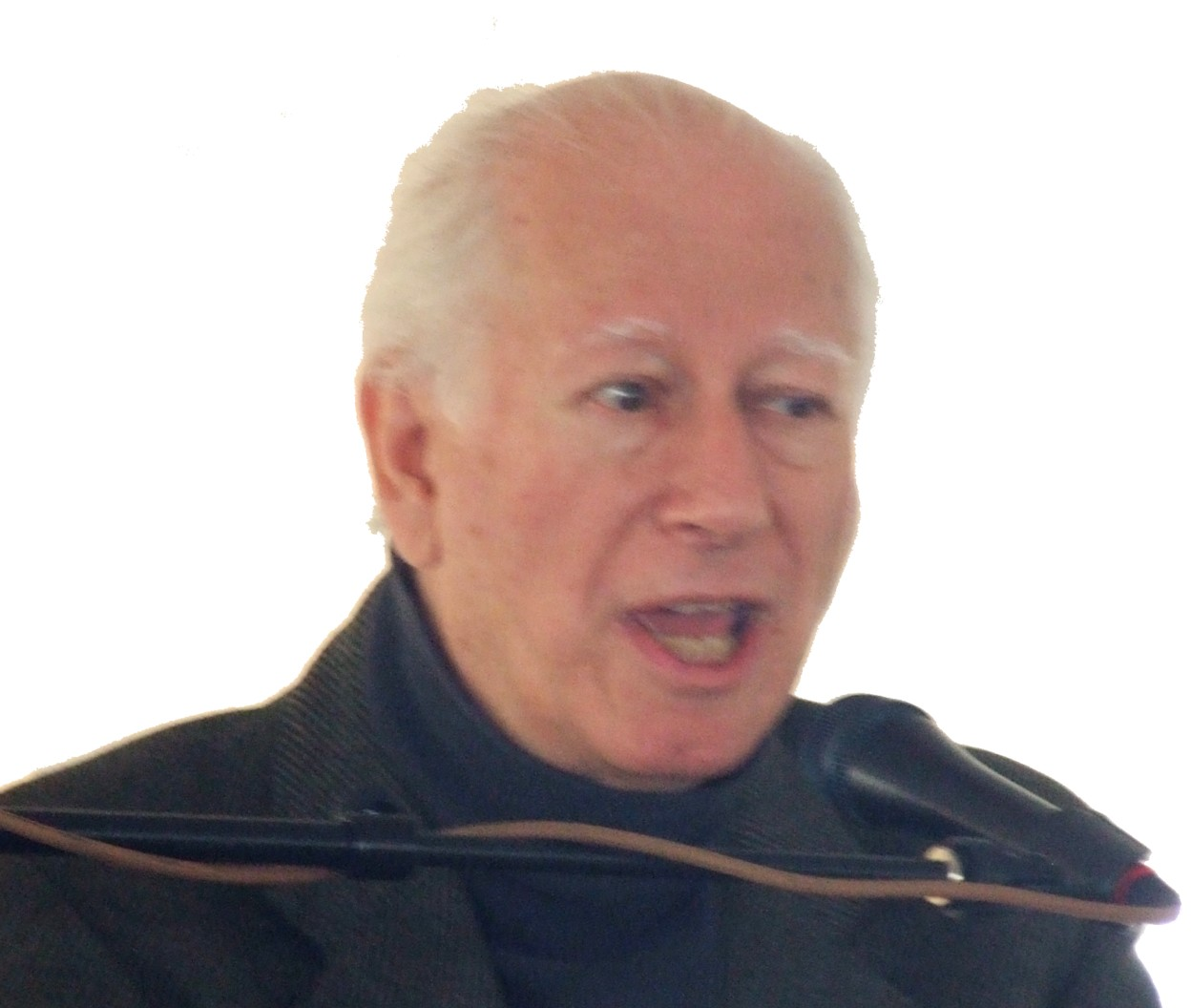
Howard Engel

Name	Relationship	Discipline	Notability	Reference
Marianne Brandis	Undergraduate	Humanities	Author	
Martyn Burke	Undergraduate	Business & Economics	Author, screenwriter, journalist	
Howard Engel	Undergraduate	Humanities	Author and Canadian Broadcasting Corporation producer	
Marian Engel	Undergraduate	English	Author	
Marjorie Harris	Undergraduate	English	Non-fiction writer	
John Lawrence Reynolds	Undergraduate	Humanities	Novelist and non-fiction writer	

=== Medicine ===
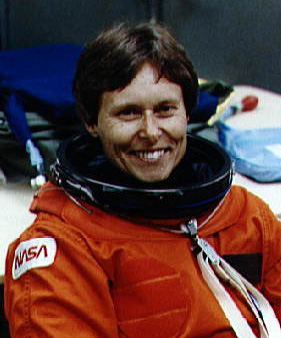
Roberta Bondar

Name	Relationship	Discipline	Notability	Reference
John Cameron Bell	Graduate	Biochemistry	Cancer researcher	
Roberta Bondar	Graduate	Medicine	NASA's space medicine researcher, first Canadian female astronaut	
Douglas Coleman	Graduate	Chemistry	Discoverer of leptin, winner of the 2010 Albert Lasker Basic Medical Research Award	
Gordon Guyatt	Graduate	Medicine	Pioneer of evidence-based medicine	
Jennifer Kwan	Graduate	Medicine	Family doctor who published COVID-19 data visualizations	
John Monahan	Graduate	Biochemistry	Founder of Avigen Inc in California, a NASDAQ-listed company	
Nancy Olivieri	Graduate	Medicine	Haematologist, researcher	
James Orbinski	Graduate	Medicine	President of Médecins Sans Frontières, accepted Nobel Peace Prize on their behalf	
Homer Tien	Graduate	Medicine	President and CEO of Ornge, colonel in the Canadian Forces Health Services, former director of trauma services at Sunnybrook's Tory Regional Trauma Centre, and first and current Canadian Forces Major Sir Frederick Banting Term Chair in Military Trauma Research	
Ross Upshur	Graduate	Medicine	Physician and researcher	
Elinor Wilson	Graduate	Health Science	President of Assisted Human Reproduction Canada	

=== Politics and public service ===
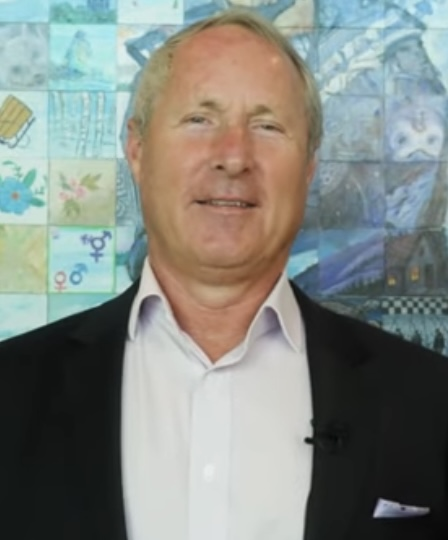
Shaun Collier

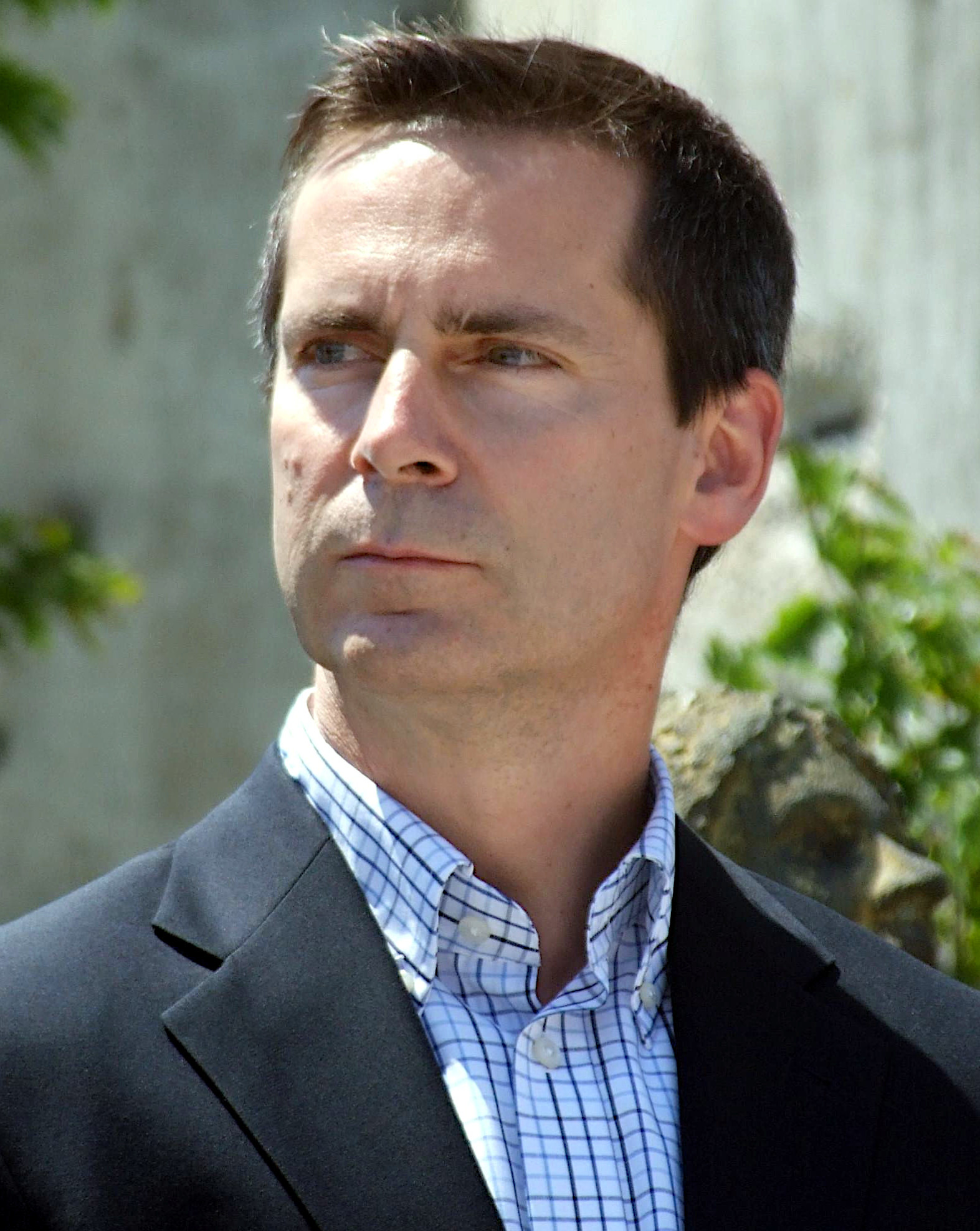
Dalton McGuinty

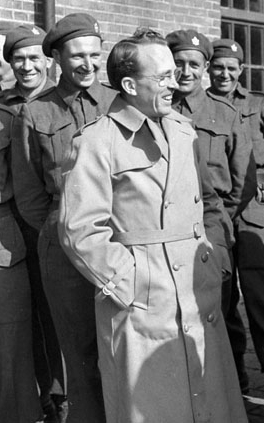
Tommy Douglas

Name	Relationship	Discipline	Notability	Reference
Lincoln Alexander	Undergraduate	History & Political Economics	Lieutenant governor of Ontario, member of Parliament of Canada	
Joy Ford Austin	Undergraduate	English literature	Executive director of Humanities DC, founding director of the African American Museums Association	
Glyn Berry	Graduate	Political Science	First Canadian diplomat killed in Afghanistan while on duty	
John H. Bryden	Undergraduate	History	Member of Parliament of Canada	
Shaun Collier	Graduate	Chartered Director	Mayor of Ajax, Ontario	
Sheila Copps	Graduate	—	Deputy prime minister of Canada, member of Parliament of Canada	
Gordon Howlett Dean	Graduate	Chemistry & Physics	Minister of Revenue for Ontario, member of Provincial Parliament of Ontario	
Tony Dean	Graduate	Sociology	Secretary of the cabinet for Ontario	
Bob Dechert	Undergraduate	Economics	Member of Parliament of Canada	
Frank Di Giorgio	Undergraduate	Mathematics	Member of the Toronto City Council	
Tommy Douglas	Graduate	Sociology	Premier of Saskatchewan, leader of the New Democratic Party	
Andrea Horwath	Undergraduate	Labour Studies	Mayor of Hamiton, former member of Provincial Parliament of Ontario, and leader of the Ontario New Democratic Party	
Eric Hoskins	Graduate	Medicine	Member of Provincial Parliament of Ontario, co-founder and president of War Child Canada	
Cam Jackson	Undergraduate	—	Member of Provincial Parliament of Ontario, mayor of Burlington, Ontario	
Sarah Jama	Graduate	Social science	Member of Provincial Parliament of Ontario, disability activist	
David Johnson	Undergraduate	Mathematics	Minister of Education for Ontario, member of Provincial Parliament of Ontario, mayor of East York	
Roy Kellock	Undergraduate	—	Puisne justice of the Supreme Court of Canada	
Stanley Knowles	Undergraduate	—	Member of Parliament of Canada	
Kevin G. Lynch	Graduate	Economics	Clerk of the Privy Council of Canada	
Dalton McGuinty	Undergraduate	Biology	Premier of Ontario, leader of the Ontario Liberal Party	
Ted McMeekin	Undergraduate	Social Work	Minister of Municipal Affairs and Housing in the Ontario Government	
Tony McWalter	Graduate	Philosophy	Member of Parliament of the United Kingdom of Great Britain and Northern Ireland	
John Munro	Undergraduate	Political Science	Member of Parliament of Canada	
Yasir Naqvi	Undergraduate	Life Sciences & Political Science	Member of Provincial Parliament of Ontario, president of the Ontario Liberal Party	
Robert Nixon	Undergraduate	Biology & Chemistry	Provincial treasurer of Ontario, leader of the Ontario Liberal Party	
Tihomir Orešković	Undergraduate and graduate	Chemistry & Business Administration	Prime minister of Croatia, CEO and chairman of Pliva and CFO of Teva Pharmaceutical Industries	
Lawrence Pennell	Undergraduate	Economics & Political Science	Solicitor general of Canada, member of Privy Council of Canada	
Beth Phinney	Undergraduate	Chemistry & Physics	Member of Provincial Parliament of Ontario	
Allan Rowe	Undergraduate	—	Member of Provincial Parliament of Nova Scotia, former radio and television broadcaster	
Munir Sheikh	Graduate	Economics	Chief Statistician of Canada	
Orysia Sushko	Undergraduate	—	President of the Ukrainian Canadian Congress	
Joe Tascona	Graduate	Business	Member of Provincial Parliament of Ontario	
Lui Temelkovski	Undergraduate	—	Member of Parliament of Canada	
Suchart Thada-Thamrongvech	Graduate	Economics	Thai finance minister	
Tony Valeri	Undergraduate	Economics	Government House leader in the Canadian House of Commons, minister of Transportation, member of Parliament of Canada	

=== Religion ===
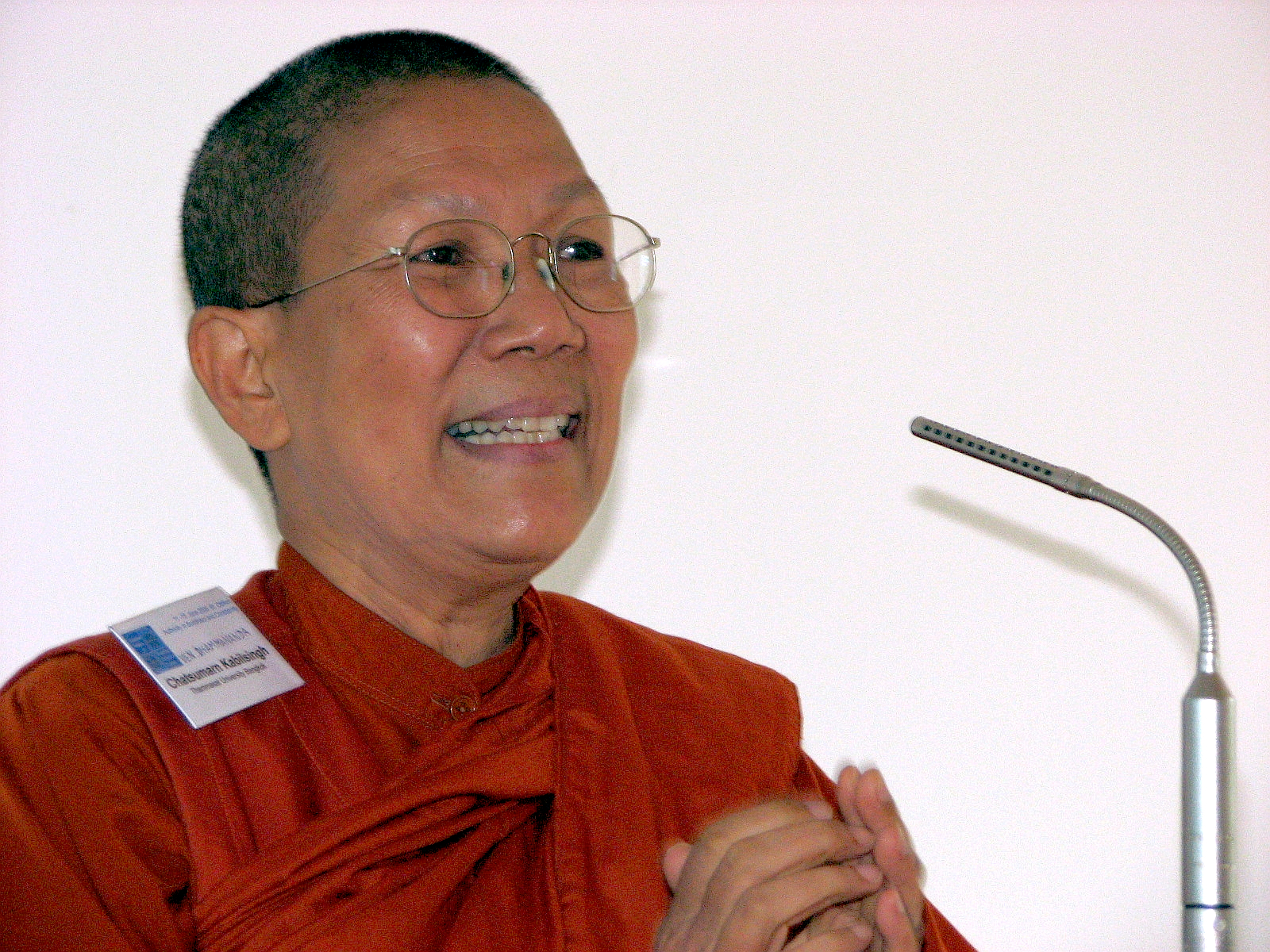
Dhammananda Bhikkhuni

Name	Relationship	Discipline	Notability	Reference
Gregory Baum	Undergraduate	Mathematics & Physics	Peritus at the Second Vatican Council, professor at McGill University and University of Toronto	
Dhammananda Bhikkhuni	Graduate	Religious Studies	First Thai woman to receive full ordination as a Theravada nun	
David Hamid	Undergraduate	—	Anglican suffragan bishop in Europe	

=== Sports ===
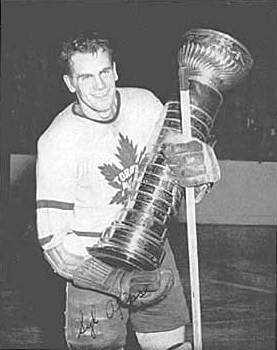
Syl Apps

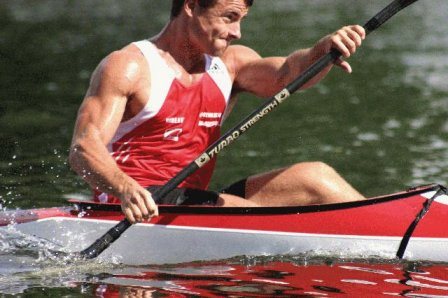
Adam van Koeverden

Name	Relationship	Discipline	Notability	Reference
Alex Anthopoulos	Undergraduate	Economics	Senior vice president of baseball operations and former general manager for the Toronto Blue Jays	
Syl Apps	Undergraduate	Political Economy	National Hockey League player, member of Provincial Parliament, gold medalist at the 1934 British Empire Games	
David Braley	Undergraduate	Economics	Canadian senator, commissioner of the Canadian Football League, owner of the Toronto Argonauts and British Columbia Lions	
Claude Brochu	Graduate	Business	Owner of the Montreal Expos	
Larry Cain	Undergraduate	—	1984 Summer Olympics gold and silver medalist, canoe sprint	
Aaron Carpenter	Undergraduate	—	Canadian rugby player	
Paul Clatney	Undergraduate	—	Canadian Football League player	
Martin Dugas	Undergraduate	—	Canadian soccer player	
Fabio Filice	Undergraduate	Mathematics	Canadian Football League player	
Russ Jackson	Undergraduate	Mathematics	Canadian Football League player	
Kyle Koch	Undergraduate	Business	Canadian Football League player	
Bobby Kuntz	Undergraduate	—	Canadian Football League player	
Jesse Lumsden	Undergraduate	Anthropology	Football player	
Joanne Malar	Undergraduate	—	Swimmer, most decorated Canadian athlete in the history of the Pan American Games	
Mike Morreale	Undergraduate	—	Canadian Football League player	
Roger Neilson	Undergraduate	Physical Education	National Hockey League coach	
Chris Pellini	Undergraduate	Biology	Silver medalist at the 2007 Pan American Games, sprint canoe	
Adam van Koeverden	Undergraduate	Kinesiology	Gold and bronze medalist at the 2004 Summer Olympics, silver medalist at the 2008 Summer Olympics	
Ivor Wynne	Undergraduate	Political economy	Director of athletics at McMaster University 1948–1965	

=== Miscellaneous ===
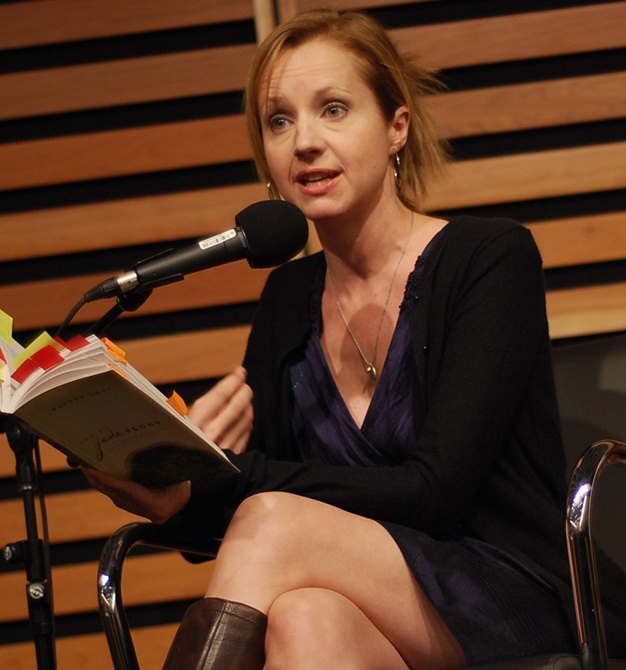
Samantha Nutt

Name	Relationship	Discipline	Notability	Reference
John F. MacGregor	Undergraduate	Chemical Engineering	Statistician and chemical engineer	
Thomas Mason	Graduate	Physics	Condensed-matter physicist, director of Los Alamos National Laboratory, former director of Oak Ridge National Laboratory	
Dan Milisavljevic	Undergraduate	Arts & Science	Aided in the discovery of several of Uranus's and Neptune's moons	
Hanna Newcombe	Undergraduate	Chemistry	Scientist and director of the Peace Research Institute	
Samantha Nutt	Graduate	Medicine	Co-founder and executive director of War Child Canada	
Rex Wang	Graduate		Rubik's Cube and Pyraminx champion	

== Faculty ==
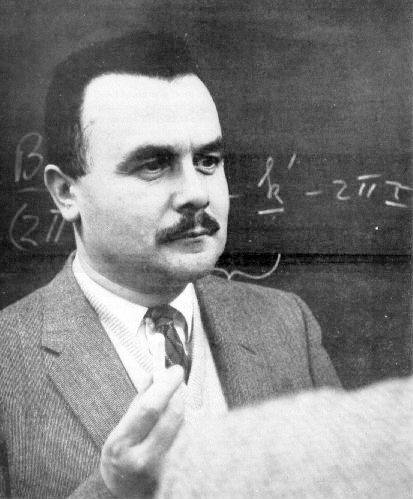
Bertram Brockhouse, professor and Nobel laureate

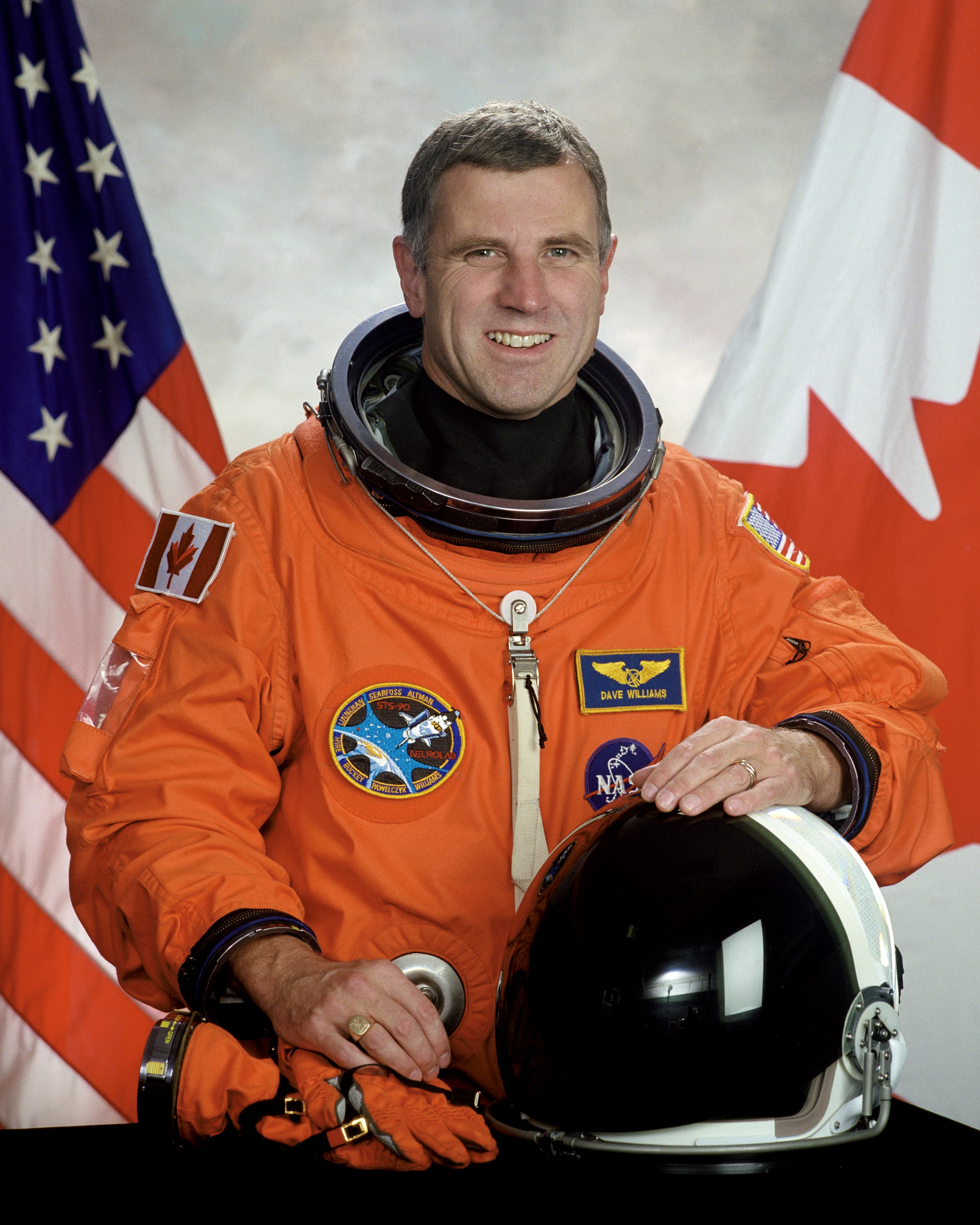
Dafydd Williams, first Canadian to perform a spacewalk

Name	Relationship	Discipline	Known for	Notes
Donald Acheson	Visiting professor	Medicine	Chief medical officer for the United Kingdom	
Roy Adams	Professor	Industrial Relations	Author, newspaper columnist and human rights activist	
Janet Ajzenstat	Professor	Political Science	Professor	
Michael Ames	Assistant professor	Anthropology	Director at the Museum of Anthropology	
Richard Bader	Professor	Chemistry	Developed atoms in molecules approach	
John Bandler	Professor	Engineering	Space mapping, use of surrogate model and engineering optimization	
Douglas Barber	Professor	Engineering Physics	Director of Institute for Quantum Computing	
John Basmajian	Professor	Medicine	Pioneer in rehabilitation science	
Bob Bearpark	Assistant professor	Physical Education	Coach of Canada men's national soccer team	
Nick Bontis	Associate professor	Business	Professional speaker and management consultant	
Arthur Bourns	Professor	Chemistry	President of McMaster University	
William H. Brackney	Professor	Historical Theology	Professor	
Bertram Brockhouse	Professor	Physics	Nobel laureate in Physics	
John Burke	Professor	Music	Composer	
Moran Campbell	Professor	Medicine	Inventor of the venturi mask	
Paul Corkum	Adjunct professor	Physics	Expert in laser physics	
Juliet Daniel	Professor	Biology	Cancer research	
M. Jamal Deen	Professor	Engineering	Professor	
Henry Duckworth	Professor	Physics	President of University of Winnipeg and chancellor of University of Manitoba	
Clifford Ford	Professor	Music	Composer	
Jean Chamberlain Froese	Professor	Obstetrics and Gynecology	Established Save the Mothers International	
Ronald Gillespie	Professor	Chemistry	Shaped VSEPR theory	
Henry Giroux	Professor	Cultural studies	One of the founding theorists of critical pedagogy	
Cynthia Grant	Assistant professor	School of the Arts	Theatre director, co-founder of Nightwood Theatre	
Pengfei Guan	Professor	Mathematics	Professor	
Gordon Guyatt	Professor	Medicine	Pioneer of evidence-based medicine	
A. C. Heidebrecht	Professor	Engineering	Professor	
Jack Hirsh	Professor	Medicine	Professor	
Charles Jago	Professor	History	President of University of Northern British Columbia	
Ruth Landes	Professor	Anthropology	Pioneer in race and gender relations study	
Stephen Lewis	Professor	Global health	Former leader of the New Democratic Party	
John F. MacGregor	Professor	Chemical Engineering	Professor	
Peter Maitlis	Professor	Chemistry	Professor	
Greg Marshall	Coach	—	Coached the CFL's Hamilton Tiger-Cats	
Alexander Gordon McKay	Professor	Classics	Professor	
James Fraser Mustard	Professor	Medicine	Founder of the Canadian Institute for Advanced Research	
Evelyn Nelson	Professor	Mathematics	Professor	
Kim Richard Nossal	Professor	Political Science	Professor	
David Parnas	Professor	Software Engineering	Developed the concept of information hiding	
Ralph Pudritz	Professor	Astrophysics	First director of the Origins Institute	
Paul Rapoport	Professor	Music	Composer	
Adele Reinhartz	Professor	Religious Studies	Adjunct professor	
Charles Roland	Professor	History of Medicine	Professor	
Clark Ross	Professor	Music	Professor	
David Sackett	Professor	Clinical Epidemiology	Pioneer of evidence-based medicine	
Edward Togo Salmon	Professor	History	Professor	
Leslie Shemilt	Dean	Engineering	Professor	
Stuart Lyon Smith	Professor	Medicine	Leader of the Ontario Liberal Party	
James Stewart	Professor	Engineering	Professor	
Harry Thode	Professor	Chemistry	Later became president and vice-chancellor of McMaster University	
John Thomas	Professor	Philosophy	Later appointed to McMaster Medical Faculty as "Resident Ethicist"	
Ethan Vishniac	Professor	Astronomy	Editor-in-chief of The Astrophysical Journal	
Alan Walker	Professor	Music	Biographer of Franz Liszt	
Roger G. Walker	Professor	Geography	Professor	
David Wilkinson	Distinguished professor	Engineering	Former dean of Engineering (2008–2012)	
Dafydd Williams	Director	Medicine	Director of McMaster Centre of Medical Robotics, astronaut	
Daniel Woolf	Professor	History	Principal of Queen's University at Kingston	
Ivor Wynne	Director	Physical education	Director of athletics 1948–1965, and dean of male students 1965–1970	

== Chancellors and presidents ==
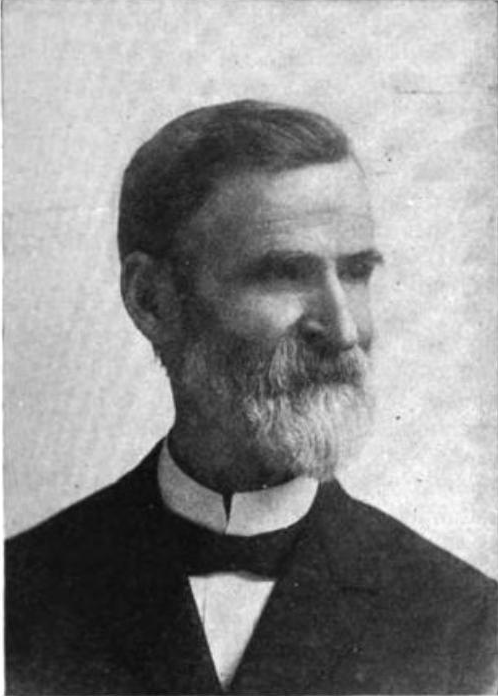
Malcolm MacVicar, the first chancellor of McMaster University

From 1888 to 1949, the head of the university was given the title of chancellor. In 1949, the office of president was created and George P. Gilmour was both president and chancellor. In 1950 his title changed to president and vice-chancellor. From that time onward, the university had both a chancellor as well as a president and vice-chancellor. The office of vice-chancellor has always been held by the incumbent president of the university.

=== Chancellors ===
McMaster University has had 19 chancellors in office since its existence. In the two years between the retirement of Chancellor MacVicar and the appointment of Chancellor Rand (1890–1892), the Faculties of Art and Theology were organized under the chairmanship of Dr. Rand and Dr. Goodspeed, respectively.

#	Name	Term	References
1	Malcolm MacVicar	1888–1890	
2	Theodore Harding Rand	1892–1895	
3	Rev. Oates C.S. Wallace	1895–1905	
4	Alexander C. McKay	1905–1911	
5	Abraham Lincoln McCrimmon	1911–1922	
6	Howard P. Whidden	1922–1941	
7	George Gilmour	1941–1950	
8	E. Carey Fox	1950–1955	
9	Roy Kellock	1955–1960	
10	Charles P. Fell	1960–1965	
11	D'Arcy Argue Counsell Martin	1965–1971	
12	Lawrence Pennell	1971–1977	
13	Allan Leal	1977–1986	
14	John H. Panabaker	1986–1992	
15	James H. Taylor	1992–1998	
16	Melvin M. Hawkrigg	1998–2007	
17	Lynton Wilson	2007–2013	
18	Suzanne Labarge	2013–2019	
19	Santee Smith	2019–present	

=== Presidents and vice-chancellors ===
Peter George, McMaster's longest serving president and vice-chancellor

The university has had seven presidents and vice-chancellors since the office was created in 1950.

#	Name	Term	References
1	George Gilmour	1950–1961	
2	Harry Thode	1961–1972	
3	Arthur Bourns	1972–1980	
4	Alvin A. Lee	1980–1990	
5	Geraldine A. Kenney-Wallace	1990–1995	
6	Peter George	1995–2010	
7	Patrick Deane	2010–2019	
7	David H. Farrar	2019–present (Note: Farrar was named as the interim university president, beginning 1 July 2019. He was later named the permanent university president, with his first official term beginning in July 2020.)	

== See also ==
- List of McMaster University Olympic athletes, coaches and officials
- Category:McMaster University alumni
- Category:Academic staff of McMaster University
