= George Gilmer =

George Gilmer may refer to:

- George Gilmer Sr. (1700–1757), mayor of Williamsburg, Virginia
- George Rockingham Gilmer (1790–1859), American statesman and politician in Georgia

== See also ==
- George Gilmore (1898–1985), Protestant IRA leader
- George Crosby Gilmore (1860–1937), Australian politician
- George Gilmour (1900–1963), academic
