= Allan Leal =

Canadian Academic

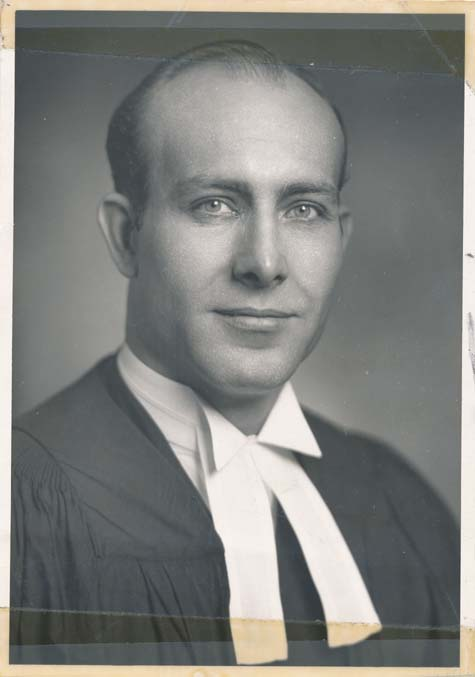

Chancellor of the McMaster University
- In office 1977–1986
- Preceded by: Lawrence Pennell
- Succeeded by: John H. Panabaker

Personal details
- Born: Herbert Allan Borden Leal; June 15, 1917 Beloeil, Quebec, Canada
- Died: October 12, 1999 (aged 82) Toronto, Ontario, Canada
- Education: McMaster University; Oxford University
- Occupation: civil servant and academic

Herbert Allan Borden Leal, OC QC (June 15, 1917 – October 12, 1999) was a Canadian civil servant and academic. He was Deputy Attorney General of Ontario, dean of Osgoode Hall Law School, and chancellor of McMaster University.

Born in Beloeil, Quebec, Leal received a Bachelor of Arts degree in 1940 from McMaster University. A Rhodes Scholar from Ontario in 1940, he never took up the appointment due to the war. He served with the Royal Canadian Artillery during World War II in Canada, England, and the United States. He was discharged with the rank of captain. After the war, he attended Osgoode Hall Law School from 1945 to 1948. He received a Master of Laws degree from Harvard Law School in 1957. He was called to the Bar of Ontario 1948 and was created a Queen's Counsel in 1959.

Leal practiced law from 1948 to 1950. In 1950, he became a lecturer at Osgoode Hall Law School. In 1956, he became vice-dean and a full professor of law. From 1958 to 1966, he was dean of the law school. He was dean of Osgoode Hall Law School, when it was engaged in a major debate about the future of legal education in Ontario – and in particular, how much influence the legal profession should have on legal education. He was appointed vice-chairman of the Ontario Law Reform Commission, which was the first statutory law reform body in the British Commonwealth. Upon the appointment of the Honourable James C. McRuer to head the Royal Commission on Civil Rights, Leal became chairman of the Ontario Law Reform Commission. He headed the Canadian delegation to the Hague Conference on Private International Law and chaired the drafting committee that piloted the Hague Convention on International Child Abduction. He was also a special lecturer in property law in the Faculty of Law at the University of Toronto from 1972 to 1977. From 1977 to 1981, he was the deputy attorney general of Ontario, the head civil servant in the department which is similar to a Deputy Minister, during the negotiation of the Trudeau era constitutional reforms which led to the Canadian Charter of Rights and Freedoms. He contributed to Roy McMurtry's reputation as a law reformer and was intimately involved in the province's family law reforms. On stepping down from the Ministry in 1981, he served as special adviser to Premier William G. Davis on Constitutional Matters. From 1977 to 1986, he was chancellor of McMaster University, where he had been a star of the university football team.

From 1975 to 1976, Leal was president of the Empire Club of Canada. From 1991 to 1994, he was reeve of the Municipality of Village of Tweed.

In 1983, Leal was made an Officer of the Order of Canada. He received honorary degrees from McMaster University (1963), York University (1978), University of Western Ontario (1982) and Dalhousie University (1983).

Academic offices
| Preceded by Lawrence Pennell | Chancellor of McMaster University; 1977–1986 | Succeeded by John H. Panabaker |
