= Melvin M. Hawkrigg =

Canadian football player and academic administrator (1930–2024)

Melvin Hawkrigg OMC

Chancellor of McMaster University
- In office 1998–2007
- Preceded by: James H. Taylor
- Succeeded by: Lynton Wilson

Personal details
- Born: Melvin Michael Hawkrigg; August 26, 1930 Toronto, Ontario, Canada
- Died: June 24, 2024 (aged 93) Waterdown, Ontario, Canada
- Spouse: Marilyn
- Children: 5
- Education: McMaster University (1952)
- Occupation: Accountant, football player

Melvin Michael Hawkrigg OMC (August 26, 1930 – June 24, 2024) was a Canadian football player and accountant who served as the Chancellor of McMaster University from 1998 to 2007. Born in Toronto, he graduated from McMaster in 1952. While at McMaster, he played on the football, basketball, hockey, and track teams and was later inducted into the athletic hall of fame in 1984. Hawkrigg was also inducted into the McMaster University Business Hall of Fame. He also played briefly for the Hamilton Tiger Cats in 1952. In 2014, Hawkrigg and Kathleen Martin Ginis were the only McMaster recipients of the Ontario Medal for Good Citizenship for their "exceptional, long-term contributions to the well-being of their communities."

Hawkrigg died in Waterdown, Ontario on June 24, 2024, at the age of 93.

Academic offices
Preceded by James H. Taylor	Chancellor of McMaster University; 1998–2007	Succeeded by Lynton Wilson
