= John H. Panabaker =

Canadian insurance executive (1928–2023)

Chancellor of McMaster University
- In office 1986–1992
- Preceded by: Allan Leal
- Succeeded by: James H. Taylor

Personal details
- Born: 31 July 1928 Preston, Ontario
- Died: 5 February 2023 (aged 94) Waterloo, Ontario
- Spouse: Janet Mary Dickson (m. 1954)
- Education: McMaster University (BA 1950, MA 1954)

John Harry Panabaker (31 July 1928 – 5 February 2023) was a Canadian insurance executive who served as the Chancellor of McMaster University from 1986 to 1992. He served as president and CEO of Mutual Life from 1973 to 1982, and chair and CEO from 1982 to 1985.

Panabaker died on February 5, 2023, at the age of 94.

Academic offices
Preceded by Allan Leal	Chancellor of McMaster University; 1986–1992	Succeeded by James H. Taylor
