= Santee Smith =

Canadian educator

Santee Smith Tekaronhiáhkhwa CM
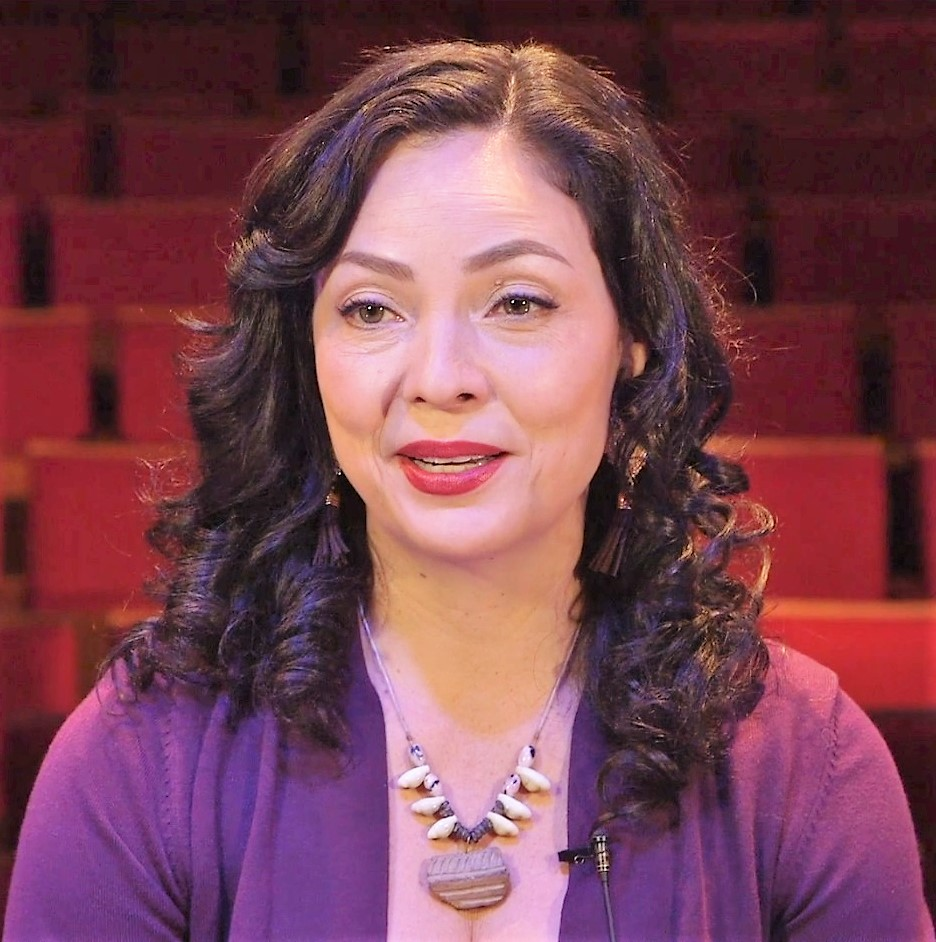
- Smith receiving the 2019 Johanna Metcalf Performing Arts Prize

19th Chancellor of McMaster University
- Incumbent
- Assumed office November 21, 2019
- Preceded by: Suzanne Labarge

Personal details
- Children: 1
- Education: McMaster University; York University

Santee Smith or Tekaronhiáhkhwa CM is a Canadian Mohawk multidisciplinary artist, dancer, designer, producer, and choreographer. She has used her voice and research to create dance works representing Indigenous identities. She is an advocate for Indigenous performances and is one of Canada's most dominating dance artists. Santee Smith has amassed multiple awards throughout her career and in 2019, she was appointed Chancellor of McMaster University in Hamilton, Ontario, Canada.

== Biography ==
=== Early life and education ===
Smith grew up on the Six Nations of the Grand River reserve. She is a member of the Mohawk Nation.

When Smith was three years old, she was hit by a vehicle, resulting in injuries that placed her in a body cast. That same year, she broke her other leg in a cycling accident. Smith began dancing as a form of physical therapy. At age 11, she was accepted into Canada's National Ballet School, where she trained for six years, but never completed it. She claimed it was because she felt that her education was not allowing her to connect with her Mohawk identity. She also at some time during her training was in Banff at the Aboriginal Dance Program.

Smith attended McMaster University, earning degrees in physical education and psychology. She also earned a master's degree in dance from York University in Toronto.

=== Artistic career ===
She took a hiatus from dancing to focus on her degree but missed the creativity that dance offered so she began to choreograph dances in 1996 and created her very first dance work in 2004. She committed six years of work to it and named it Kaha:wi, which means "to carry".

In 2005, Smith founded and serves as the artistic director and producer of Kaha:wi Dance Theatre, a Six Nations company based in Toronto. The goal of creating this dance theatre was to ignite interest in the collaboration of training, Indigenous identity, and performance. Smith's work introduces modern Haudenosaunee songs and dance, and mixes it with traditional ones to bring the present and past together in a way that honours the integrity and culture of the material.

Smith also creates pottery pieces as a way to demonstrate her Indigenous identity and was recently chosen to have her work "Talking Earth", which depicts the traumas of colonization, as a permanent art piece at the Gardiner Museum. She has also had her pottery designs shown in other exhibits such as in the Woodland Cultural Centre and the National Gallery of Canada. Her families involvement in pottery dates back to her grandmother, Elda "Bun" Smith, who caught an interest in pottery after finding broken pottery pieces throughout her reserve. After researching their significance and history she found that pottery was historically a Mohawk tradition that had gradually dissolved when explorers came to North America. Santee's grandmother helped revive the tradition of pottery and passed down this tradition onto Santee's parents who now have a pottery business which Santee also works at.

Smith also uses pottery as a way to incorporate Indigenous identity into her performances. The pottery she incorporates is Indigenous made and has images and symbols that represent important aspects of Indigenous culture such as earth and how one must live in balance with it. In the production Blood Ties that she helped produce, she used a piece of pottery that her father specifically curated for the performance, as her parents are very well known Mohawk ceramic artists. Additionally, the work that Smith creates also involves the collaboration of many Indigenous peoples. When creating her first dance Kaha:wi, she interviewed members of her reserve and family to help her create the storyline around Haudenosaunee life and ideologies as well as utilized Indigenous musicians to create the music for her production.

Santee Smith has created 14 different productions outside of the many short creations she has also been responsible for, and her productions have seen the stages of many places nationally and internationally. Her research and passion has made her into an advocate for Indigenous dramatic performances and practice by creating storylines that represent Indigenous lives. Moreover, through her works she also reconstructs the understandings of gender, specifically highlighting how colonization has impacted the way in which women are understood in Indigenous traditions. Smith shows how traditionally women within her Haudenosaunee and Mohawk culture were seen as powerful, sexually empowered, and even owners of land and uses her performances as an attempt to reclaim those identities.

Some of the creations Smith has helped choreographed have been a 2017 Canadian Opera Company production of Louis Riel, an opera based on the story of the Métis leader Louis Riel. The same year, she designed the opening ceremony act for the North American Indigenous Games, held in Toronto. With Kaha:wi Dance Theatre, Smith created The Mush Hole: Truth, Acknowledgement, Resilience, a performance piece about the Mohawk Institute, a residential school for First Nations children that operated in Brantford, Ontario. In 2019, the show premiered at Young People's Theatre in Toronto, before embarking on a North American tour.

=== Chancellorship ===
In 2019, Smith was named the new Chancellor of McMaster University, succeeding Suzanne Labarge as the honorary head of the university. She is the first Indigenous person to hold this position. Smith was installed into this role on November 21, 2019 and reappointed in February 2022.

=== Honours and awards ===
Work related awards
Year	Category	Work	Award	Result	Ref.
2005	Best Cultural and Ethnic Recording	Kaha:wi album	Hamilton Music Awards	Won	
2008	Outstanding Performance	A Story Before Time	Dora Mavor Moore Awards	Nominated	
	Outstanding Production	A Story Before Time	Dora Mavor Moore Awards	Nominated	
2012	Outstanding Production	TransMigration	Dora Mavor Moore Awards	Nominated	
	Outstanding Sound Design/Composition	TransMigration	Dora Mavor Moore Awards	Nominated	
2013	Outstanding Choreography in the Dance	Susuriwka – willow bridge	Dora Mavor Moore Awards	Won	
	Outstanding Sound Design/Composition	Susuriwka – willow bridge	Dora Mavor Moore Awards	Nominated	
2014	Outstanding Performance – Female	NeoIndigenA	Dora Mavor Moore Awards	Nominated	
2019	Outstanding Performance Ensemble in Dance	Blood Tides	Dora Mavor Moore Awards	Won	
	Outstanding Production	Blood Tides	Dora Mavor Moore Awards	Won	
	Outstanding Original Choreography	Blood Tides	Dora Mavor Moore Awards	Nominated	
2020	Outstanding Production	The Mush Hole	Dora Mavor Moore Awards	Won	
	Outstanding New Play	The Mush Hole	Dora Mavor Moore Awards	Won	
	Outstanding Direction	The Mush Hole	Dora Mavor Moore Awards	Won	
	Outstanding Performance by an Ensemble	The Mush Hole	Dora Mavor Moore Awards	Won	

Non work related awards
Year	Award	Association	Ref.
2003	Chalmers Award for Dance	Ontario Arts Council	
	H. M. Hunter Award for Dance	Ontario Arts Council	
2006	Victor Martyn Lynch-Staunton Award for Dance	Canada Council for the Arts	
2008	John Hobday Awards for Excellence in Arts Administration	Canada Council for the Arts	
2015	Eihwaedei Yerihwayente:ri (Community Scholar)	Six Nations Polytechnic	
2017	REVEAL Indigenous Arts Award in Dance	The Hnatyshyn Foundation	
2019	Outstanding Achievement in the Performing Arts	Celebration of Nations	
	Joanna Metcalfe Performing Arts Award	The Metcalfe Foundation	
2023	Member of the Order of Canada		

Academic offices
Preceded by Suzanne Labarge	Chancellor of McMaster University; 21 November 2019 – Present	Incumbent
