= Anupam Sen =

Author

- অনুপম সেন
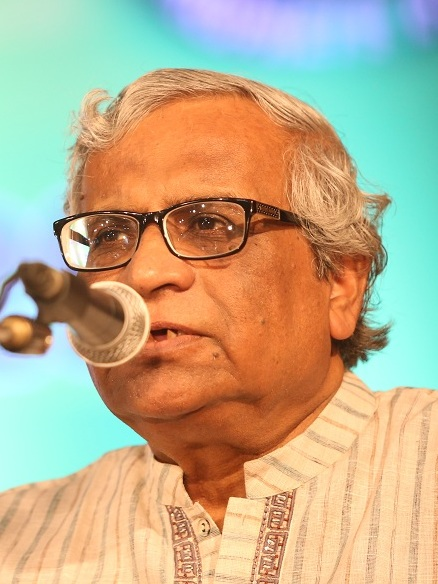
- Sen in 2015

Vice-Chancellor of Premier University
- In office 1 October 2006 – 7 December 2024
- Chancellor: Mohammad Shahabuddin; Mohammad Abdul Hamid

Personal details
- Born: 5 August 1940 (age 86) Patiya, Chittagong, Bengal Presidency, British India
- Education: University of Dhaka; McMaster University; Chittagong Municipal Model High School
- Profession: Author
- Awards: Ekushey Padak

Anupam Sen (born 5 August 1940) is a Bangladeshi author, sociologist, and social activist. He was the vice-chancellor of Premier University, Chittagong. He was awarded Ekushey Padak in 2014 by the Government of Bangladesh.

== Birth and family background ==
Anupam Sen was born to Snehalata Sen and Birendra Lal Sen on 5 August 1940 in Chittagong city, British India. in Bangladesh. His father, Birendra Lal, had completed his master's degree in English from Presidency College, Kolkata, and law from Ripon College. Sen's great-grandfather, Sharat Chandra Das, was a scholar who, having traveled to the then forbidden land of Tibet in the 1880s, wrote the book My Journey to Central Tibet and Lasha about Tibetan life–its polity, society and culture. He also discovered the Sanskrit epic Bodhisotto Obodan, written by the poet Khemendra, and translated it to Bengali. Rabindranath Tagore took inspiration from this epic to write Shyama, Pujarini, and some of his finest dance dramas and poetry. Sen's uncle, Shashanka Mohan Sen, a critic and poet, upon invitation from Ashutosh Mukherjee, joined Kolkata University in West Bengal in 1918 as a professor in the newly opened department of Bengali language and literature. Thus, Sen grew up in a vibrant cultural environment.

== Personal life ==
In 1966, Sen married Uma Sengupta.

== Education ==
Sen completed his Bachelor of Arts degree with honors in 1962 and his master's degree in 1963 in sociology from the University of Dhaka. In 1979, he obtained his PhD in sociology from McMaster University, Ontario, Canada. His PhD dissertation on political economy and economic development, entitled The State, Industrialization and Class Formations in India was published by Routledge and Kegan-Paul, London in 1982. The book has been reviewed in many international journals, including World Development and the Journal of Development Studies. It has also been included as a reference book on many courses in development studies, political science, and other social sciences in universities of Europe, North America, and India.

== Career ==
In 1965, Sen started his career at the age of 25. In March 1965, he joined BUET as a lecturer and began his four-decade career as a teacher. In 1966, he joined the University of Dhaka as a lecturer, and three years later, made a transition to the newly opened sociology department at the University of Chittagong as an assistant professor. He became a professor in this department in 1984 and was elected the Dean of Social Sciences in the same year. He also served on the board of directors of Bangladesh Bank from 1997 to 2001. On 1 October 2006, he became the vice chancellor of Premier University, Chittagong. Amid student protests, Anupam Sen, serving as the vice-chancellor of Premier University, Chattogram, submitted his resignation on December 7, citing age-related reasons.

== Participation in Liberation War and different movements ==
Sen participated in the Bangladesh Liberation War in 1971 as a freedom fighter while he was the general secretary of the Chittagong University Teachers Association. After the war, he involved himself in various movements against injustices done to people. In 1985–86, under his leadership as the president of the Federation of Bangladesh University Teachers' Association, teachers from different universities broke the martial law and marched the streets for the restoration of democratic rights.

== Awards ==
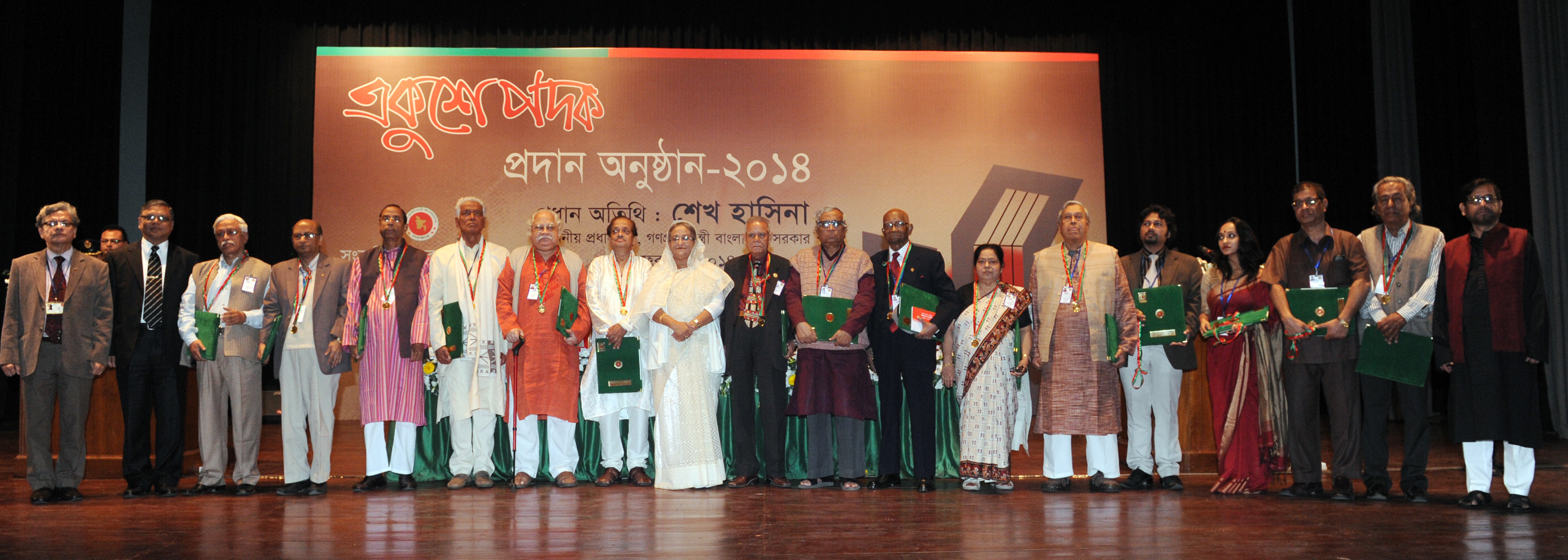
Sen along with other Ekushey Padak 2014 recipients

- Ekushey Padak, an award given by the state, for his contribution to education (2014)
- University Grant Commission Award (2007)
- Group Theater Federation Award (2006)
- Rahe Bhander Ennoble Award (2016)
- United Nations Day Award (2002)
- Udichi Shilpi Gosthi Award (1995)
- Jahanara Imam Memorial Award (2010)
- Ekushey Mela Porishod, Chittagong Ekushey Padak (2007)

== Published books and research ==
Sen has a significant number of publications and articles on sociology, literature, arts, and culture. His most notable book, The State, Industrialization and Class Formations in India was published by Routledge in 1982. The book was republished in 2017 under a new series titled British in India. It has been included in the reading lists of courses on sociology, political science, development studies, and other related social sciences in many universities in the US, the European Union, and India. It has also been reviewed in international journals, including World Development and Journal of Development Studies. In World Development, the review was by Michael Lipton, an expert on Indian economics. Sen's books and articles on social sciences and literature include:

- The State, Industrialization and Class Formations in India, London: Routledge and Kegan-Paul (1982, 2017)
- The Political Elites of Pakistan: Their Role in Pakistan's Disintegration (1982)
- Bangladesh: Rashtra O Samaj (Bangladesh: State and Society), Dhaka: Abosar (1988/1999)
- Byakti O Rashtro, Samaj- Binyas O Samaj-Darshaner Aloke (Individual and State: In Light of Social Structure and Philosophy). Dhaka: Abosar (2007/2008)
- Adi-Anto Bangali: Bangali Satthar Bhut-Bhabishyat (The Eternal Bengali: Past and Future of Bengali Identity). Dhaka: Abosar (2011)
- Bangladesh: Bhabadarshagata Bhitti O Muktir Swapna. Dhaka (Bangladesh: Ideological Foundation and the Dream of Liberation): Abosar (2011)
- Kobi-Somalochok Shashanka Mohan Sen (Poet-Critic Shashanka Mohan Sen). Dhaka: Abosar, (2013)
- Bilosito Shabdoguchho (A Collection of Poems of East & West: translated in Bengali), Dhaka: Abosar (2002)
- Jibaner Pothe Prantare (Through the Pathways of Life). Chittagong: Balaka (2011)
- Sundarer Bichar Savate (In the Court of Beauty). Dhaka: Abosar (2008)
- Itihase Abinasvar (Eternal in History), Chittagong: Balaka (2016)
- Bangladesh O Bangali:Renaissance, Sadhinata-Chinta O Atmanusandhan (Bangladesh and the Bengalis: Renaissance, Thoughts of Freedom, and Self-Exploration). Dhaka: Abosar (2002, 2011)
- Bangali-Manon, Bangali Sanskriti: Satti Baktrita (Bengali Intellect, Bengali Culture: Seven Lectures). Dhaka: Protik (2014)
- Bichito Bhabna (Diverse Reflections), Chittagong: Balaka (2007, 2017)

Major Articles

- The Social Background of Bangladesh Movement, Quest (Bombay), September–October 1971.
- The Bureaucracy and Socio-Economic Development in Bangladesh, Bangladesh Journal of Sociology, August 1983.
- Social Change in South Asia, Presidential Address, Third National Conference and International Seminar on Social Change in South Asia, Dhaka: Bangladesh Sociology Association, 18–20 March 1987.
- Modes of Production and Social Formation in India, 2nd article of the book entitled, "Class, State and Development in India" Edited by Berch Berberoglu (Professor, University of Nevada, U.S.A) New Delhi /London – Sage Publications, 1992.

== Relation with organizations ==
Sen has held important positions in various university committees and organizations:

- Ex-General Secretary, Chittagong University Teachers' Association, January 1971 to March 1972.
- President, Chittagong University Teachers' Association, January 1985 to December 1986.
- President, Federation of Bangladesh University Teachers' Association, February 1985 to March 1986.
- President, Bangladesh Sociology Association, 1987–1992.
- President, Odissi & Tagore Dance Movement Centre, Chittagong, Bangladesh.
- Senior Fellow (Honorary), Bangladesh Institute of Development Studies (BIDS),
- Director, board of directors, Institute of Bangladesh Studies, Rajshahi University, Rajshahi
- Director, board of directors, Bangladesh Bank, Dhaka (Central Bank of Bangladesh)
- Member, Academic Council, Shah Jalal University of Science and Technology, Sylhet
- Member, Academic Council, East West University, Dhaka
- Life Member, Bangiya Sahitya Parishad, Calcutta
- Dean, Faculty of Social Sciences, University of Chittagong, Chittagong
