= James H. Taylor =

Canadian diplomat (born 1930)

James "Si" Taylor
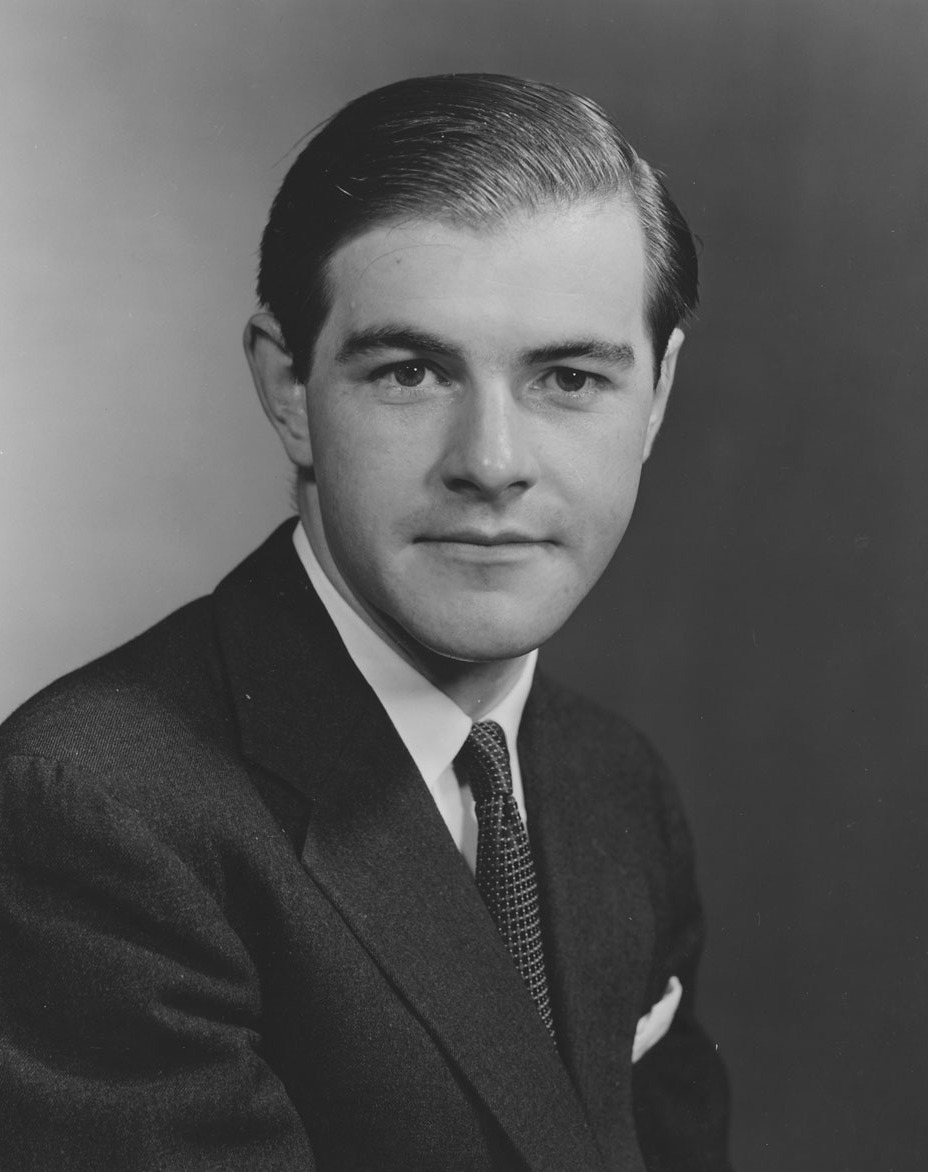
- Taylor, c. 1955

Chancellor of the McMaster University
- In office 1992–1998
- Preceded by: John H. Panabaker
- Succeeded by: Melvin M. Hawkrigg

Personal details
- Born: March 25, 1930 (age 96) Hamilton, Ontario
- Education: McMaster University (1951); Oxford University
- Occupation: diplomat

James Hutchings "Si" Taylor, OC (born March 25, 1930) is a Canadian former diplomat who served as the Chancellor of McMaster University from 1992 to 1998. Taylor was born and raised in Hamilton and was a Rhodes Scholar, graduating from McMaster in 1951. He worked for the Canadian Department of External Affairs for 40 years and served posts in Vietnam, India, France, the Soviet Union, and Belgium. He also served as the Canadian Ambassador to Japan, Ambassador to NATO; Director–General of European Affairs and Undersecretary of State for External Affairs.

Academic offices
Preceded by John H. Panabaker	Chancellor of McMaster University; 1991–1998	Succeeded by Melvin M. Hawkrigg
