= The State, Industrialization and Class Formations in India =

1982 nonfiction book by Anupam Sen

- Book Cover
- Author: Dr. Anupam Sen
- Original title: The State, Industrialization and Class Formations in India
- Language: English
- Publisher: Routledge & Kegan Paul
- Publication date: 1982
- Publication place: Bangladesh
- Pages: 289
- ISBN: 0710008880

The State, Industrialization and Class Formations in India: a neo-marxist perspective on colonialism, underdevelopment and development is a book by Ekushey Padak laureate Bangladeshi social scientist Professor Dr. Anupam Sen. It describes the nature of the state in India and the role played by it in the evolution of the social economy, particularly in the growth of industry.

== Edition ==
The State, Industrialization and Class Formations in India was published by Routledge in 1982. The book has been republished by Routledge in 2017 as a new edition under a new series Routledge Library Edition: British In India. This series included 30 books on India containing various topics or problems caused by the British rule. It has been included in the reading lists of courses in sociology, political science, development studies and other related social sciences in many universities in the US, European Union and India.

== Reviews ==
The book has been reviewed in international journals, including World Development and Journal of Development Studies. The former characterized the book as "thoughtful and stimulating":

Sen convincingly shows that his account is consistent with much that Marx wrote. In his most carefully considered work Marx does not unlike many of his acolutes, natively claim that all States act as executive committees for a single ruling class. [...] Sen successfully shows that Marx saw autonomy –under many conditions, probably including India’s – as it likelier role for ‘the State’ than subservience to one class.

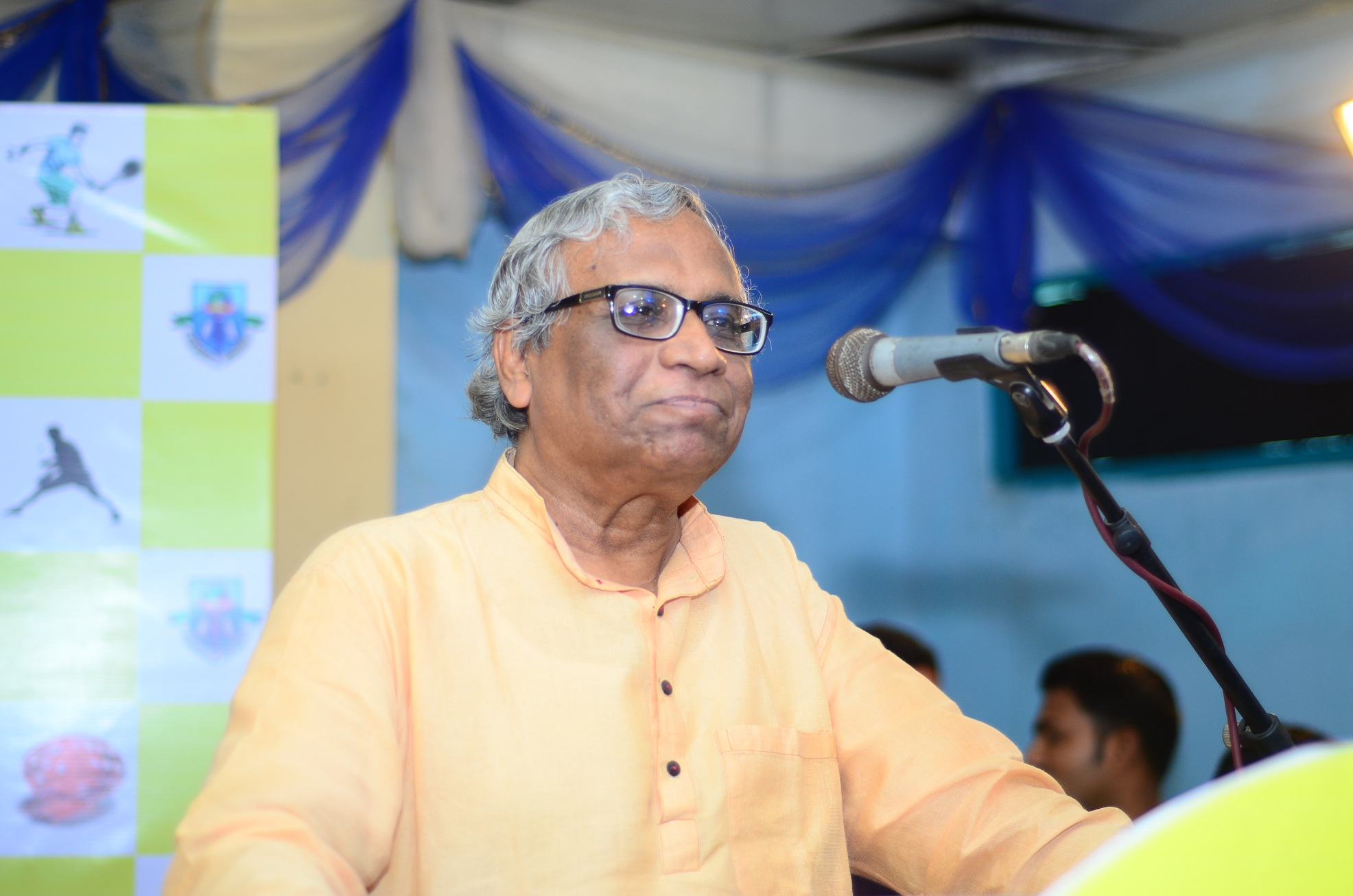
Dr. Anupam Sen

== See also ==
- Anupam Sen
