= Suzanne Labarge =

Canadian businesswoman

Suzanne B. Labarge

18th Chancellor of McMaster University
- In office 1 September 2013 – 30 August 2019
- Preceded by: Lynton Wilson
- Succeeded by: Santee Smith

Personal details
- Born: Ottawa, Canada
- Education: McMaster University; Harvard University
- Occupation: Vice-Chairman of Royal Bank of Canada; Independent Director of Bank of China; Independent Director of Novelis Inc. Director of The Coca-Cola Company; Director of XL Group plc
- Profession: Businesswoman

Suzanne B. Labarge CM (born 1940) is a Canadian businesswoman, and past chancellor of McMaster University. Labarge is a member of The Coca-Cola Company's board of directors, and was the vice-chairman of the Royal Bank of Canada.

== Career ==
Labarge was born in Canada. Labarge received a B.A. in Economics from McMaster University, and a M.B.A. from Harvard Business School. Then she worked in the federal public service, including 2 years as assistant auditor general and 8 years in the Office of the Superintendent of Financial Institutions.

She joined the Royal Bank of Canada where she became the first woman to be appointed as a Royal Bank executive in 1979, and Executive Vice-President in 1995. In 1999, she became RBC's Chief Risk Officer. During her time with RBC, she served as the chief risk officer of RBC Capital Markets Corporation and RBC Capital Markets. Labarge served as the chief risk officer of Royal Bank of Canada until September 2004 and its executive vice president and corporate treasurer from 1995 to 1998. Labarge had served as the chief risk officer at RBC Financial Group and the vice chairman at RBC Capital Markets Corporation and RBC Capital Markets. She served as the vice chairman at RBC Financial Group. Labarge served as vice chairman of Royal Bank of Canada until September 2004.

Labarge assumed the role of chancellor at McMaster University on 1 September 2013, and served a three-year term. In the previous year, Labarge contributed C$10 million to the university in an effort to fund inter-disciplinary research into the subject of aging. The university operates the Labarge Optimal Ageing Initiative. In 2007, she had endowed the Raymond and Margaret Labarge Chair in Research and Knowledge Application for Optimal Aging.

Labarge made a second gift to the University in October 2016. This gift, valued at C$15 million, established the Labarge Centre for Mobility in Aging. The focus of the Centre is to fund "interdisciplinary research into ways seniors can live more independently through greater mobility, better health and fitness and increased social connection."

== Other roles ==
- Since December 2007: Director at Coca-Cola s.
- January 2005-May 2007: Independent Director at Novelis Inc.
- Previously: Director at XL Group
- Previously: Member of supervisory board at Deutsche Bank AG and of Deutsche Bank AG
- Chairwoman of CLS Group (2001-2003)

== Distinctions ==
- 2000: Awards of Distinction by the Concordia University
- 2019: Member of the Order of Canada.

Academic offices
Preceded by Lynton Wilson	Chancellor of McMaster University; 1 September 2013–30 August 2019	Succeeded by Santee Smith
