= Kathy Bardswick =

Canadian business executive

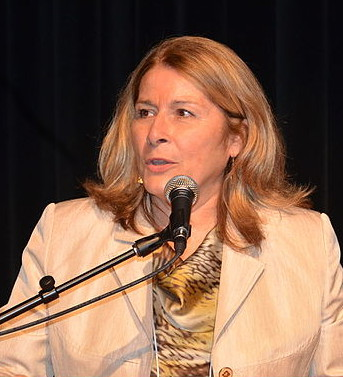
- Bardswick speaking at the Accelerate Collaborating for Sustainability Conference in Guelph, Ontario, June 2013
- Education: B.S., mathematics, University of Manitoba; MBA, McMasters University, 1978
- Occupations: President and CEO
- Years active: 1978–present
- Employer: The Co-operators
- Spouse: Bernie Mutter
- Children: 4
- Parent(s): Bill Bardswick; Annastasia MacNeil Bardswick

Kathy Bardswick is a Canadian business executive. From 2002 to 2016, she was the President and CEO of The Co-operators Group Ltd, a Canadian insurance cooperative based in Guelph, Ontario, Canada. She is one of a handful of women at the helm of the top 100 companies in Canada.

== Early life and education ==
Bardswick is one of six children born to Bill Bardswick and his wife Annastasia (née MacNeil). She earned her B.S. degree in mathematics from the University of Manitoba, and her Master of Business Administration from McMaster University.

== Career ==
Bardswick began her career with The Co-operators right out of business school in 1978. Her mother applied for the job for her and pretended she was Kathy when the company called back. Bardswick appeared at her own interview and landed a position in the property and casualty division in Sault Ste. Marie as an underwriter. Since then, she has also worked in sales, complex claims, and information systems management. From 1998 to 2002 she served as CEO for two Co-operators Group subsidiaries in Calgary, The Sovereign General and L'Union Canadienne.

In March 2002 she was named President and CEO of The Co-operators Group and its institutional investment management subsidiary, Addenda Capital Inc. She is one of a handful of women at the helm of the top 100 companies in Canada; a 2011 report named her as one of four women who are CEOs of Canada's top 100 public companies. Among her achievements, she has led the company in embedding a sustainability policy for all its operations, including office construction and automotive fleets.

== Memberships ==
Bardswick is a past chair of the International Cooperative and Mutual Insurance Federation (ICMIF), and is a member of the ICMIF executive. She is a board member of the International Co-operative Alliance and Addenda Capital. She is the chairperson of the Institute for Catastrophic Loss Reduction and a former vice-chair of the Board of Governors of the University of Guelph. She served on the executive committee of the Conference Board of Canada from 2004 to 2011.

She is also a member of the Canadian Council of Chief Executives and the Council for Clean Capitalism.

She is a frequent speaker at industry conferences and events. Her quotes and observations were included in the 2009 book Made in Canada Leadership: Wisdom from the Nation's Best and Brightest on the Art and Practice of Leadership.

== Honors and awards ==
In 2014 she was named one of the Top 50 Women of Influence in Canada's Life Insurance Industry by The Insurance and Investment Journal and one of the Top 25 Women of Influence by the Women of Influence organization.

== Personal ==
She and her husband, Bernie Mutter, have four sons. Bardswick credits her husband's willingness to work from home for her ability to pursue her career. They reside in Burlington, Ontario.

== Selected articles ==
- "Provinces can lead in building a low-carbon economy". The Globe and Mail. 13 April 2015. (with Steward Elgie and David Miller)
