= Jennifer Kwan =

Canadian physician

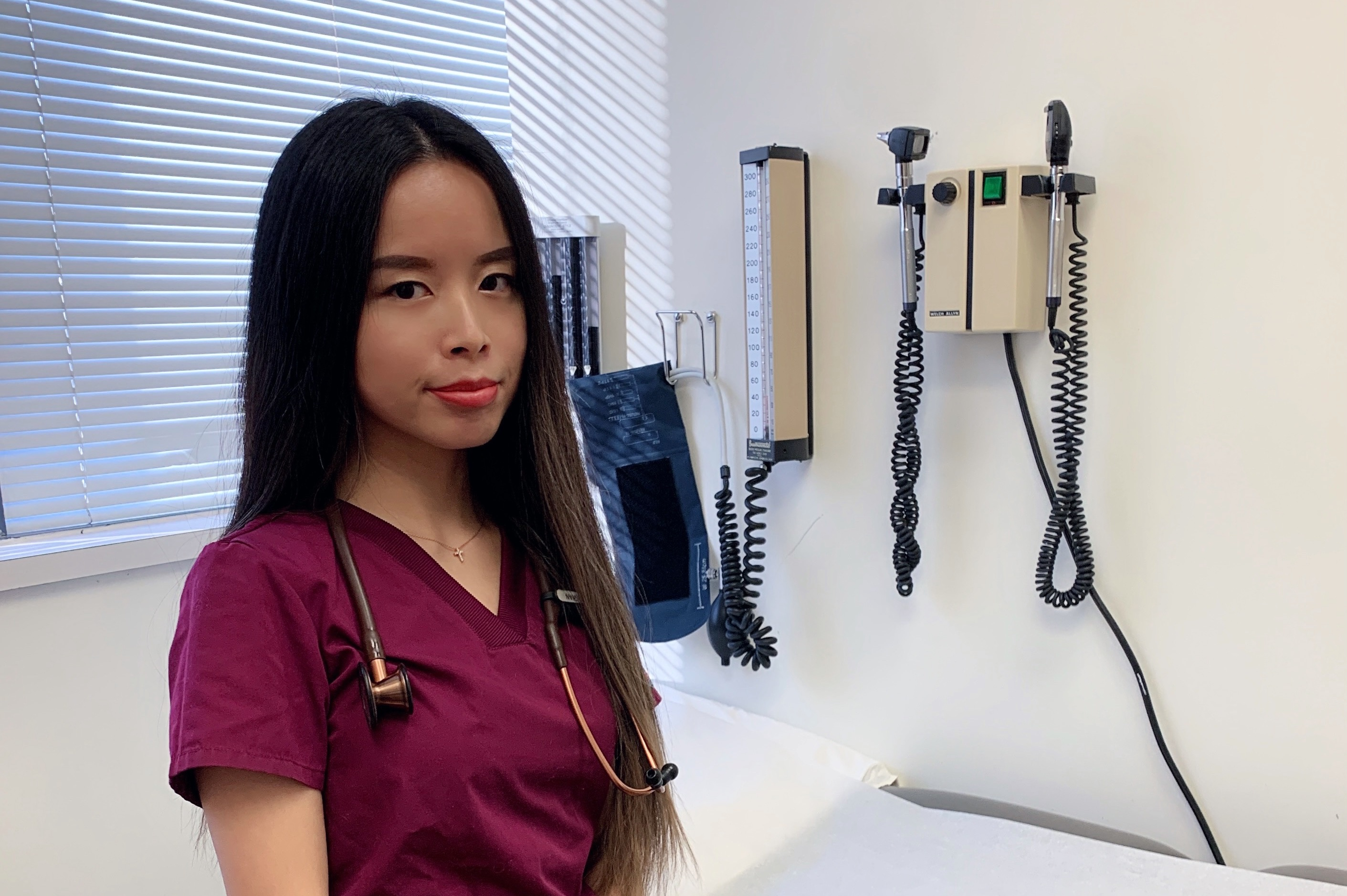
- Education: McMaster University
- Known for: COVID-19
- Scientific career
- Fields: Medicine; Epidemiology
- Workplaces: McMaster University
- Website: https://jkwanmd.com/

Jennifer Kwan is a Canadian family physician and health care advocate, with work primarily based around the COVID-19 pandemic in Ontario.

== Biography ==
=== Early life ===
Kwan is based in Burlington, Ontario.

=== Work during the COVID-19 pandemic ===
Kwan is best known for her synthesis of publicly available COVID-19 data in Ontario into a series of accessible graphs via her Twitter handle @jkwan_md, on a daily basis. Kwan also reported the daily number of recorded deaths, which notably, was omitted in daily updates from the Ontario Health Minister Christine Elliott's social media account.

Kwan co-founded the Masks4Canada group to advocate about the role of masks and face coverings in reducing COVID-19 transmission, and also co-founded the Doctors for Justice in Long-Term Care (Docs4LTCJustice) campaign to call on the Government of Ontario to take action to control the spread of COVID-19 in long-term care homes. She has spoken about different aspects of the COVID-19 pandemic, including the high levels of anxiety among Canadian doctors, the logistics of the COVID-19 vaccine roll-out across Ontario, and public health practices, for multiple media outlets.
