= Abraham Lincoln McCrimmon =

- Born: 1865; Delhi, Canada West
- Died: April 16, 1935 (aged 69–70)
- Occupation: academic
- Known for: Chancellor of McMaster University

Abraham Lincoln McCrimmon (1865 – April 16, 1935) was a Canadian academic and Chancellor of McMaster University.

Born on a farm near Delhi in Norfolk County, Ontario, McCrimmon graduated from the University of Toronto in 1890. In 1892, he started teaching at Woodstock College and five years later became its principal. From 1903 to 1904, he studied at the University of Chicago. In 1906, he was appointed a professor at McMaster University. From 1911 to 1922, he was the Chancellor of McMaster.

A Baptist, he was president of the Baptist Convention of Ontario and Quebec for three terms from 1921 and 1932. He was also a vice-president of the Baptist World Alliance. He died in 1935.
