= National Statement on Religious Diversity =

Framework for the recognition of New Zealand's diverse faith communities

The National Statement on Religious Diversity is a New Zealand statement of intent in the field of religious diversity. It is intended to provide "a framework for the recognition of New Zealand's diverse faith communities and their harmonious interaction with each other, with government and with other groups in society."

== Background ==
The statement was prepared by the Victoria University Religious Studies Programme and authored by Programme Director Professor Paul Morris. The statement was the subject of a national process of public consultation coordinated by the Human Rights Commission, and was endorsed by the National Interfaith Forum in Hamilton in February 2007 as a basis for ongoing public discussion.

== Government ratification ==
Prime Minister Helen Clark presented the statement to the third Asia-Pacific Dialogue on Interfaith Cooperation to be held at Waitangi from May 29–31, 2007.

== Controversy ==
Brian Tamaki, a Bishop of the Destiny Church stated: "That [Christianity] is the chosen religion of the Head of the Commonwealth. For us to depart from that, don't you think that that is bordering on creating some type of treason, religious treason anyhow?".

A poll of 501 New Zealanders by Research New Zealand in June 2007 found that 58% of respondents did not think Christianity should be New Zealand's official religion.

Another source of controversy has been the fact that the composition of the working group managing the formulation of the National Statement and its endorsement was limited to representatives of religious groups. Consequently, while extending some rights to non-religious people the Statement did omit to extend the right of safety (clause 3). This has led to some, such as the New Zealand Association of Rationalists and Humanists, to criticise the National Statement.
