= Rex Wang =

- Education: McMaster University
- Occupation: CEO
- Known for: Rubik's Cube record

Rex Wang (Haokun) is one of the 10 Chinese team in World Rubik’s Cube Championships in Las Vegas 2013. He is also Pyraminx Chinese record holder, Rubik’s Mater Magic Asian record holder (second in the world) and the second place holder in the Physics of the project in McMaster Engineering & Science Olympics Competitions 2012.
