= David G. Benner =

Canadian psychologist (born 1947)

David Gordon Benner (born February 9, 1947) is a Canadian depth psychologist, author and wisdom teacher.

== Education ==
Benner followed his Honours BA in psychology at McMaster University with an MA and PhD in clinical psychology at York University. After registration with the College of Psychologists of Ontario, and licensing in the state of Illinois, he was certified as an expert witness in clinical psychology in both jurisdictions. He also completed post-doctoral studies at the Chicago Institute for Psychoanalysis.

== Career ==
Benner was professor and founding chair, Graduate Department of Psychological Studies at Wheaton College in Illinois, and chair of the Department of Psychology, Redeemer University College, in Ancaster, Ontario. In Toronto, he held overlapping appointments as Adjunct Professor (Psychology and Christianity), St. Michael's College, University of Toronto; Adjunct Clinical Professor, Graduate Department of Psychology, York University; and Adjunct Clinical Professor, Ontario Institute for Studies in Education, University of Toronto. He was later the founding director of the Institute for Psychospiritual Health, and in 2016 he became the founding director of Cascadia Living Wisdom.

Between 1973 and 2006, Benner was in private practice in Illinois and Ontario. Whereas his clinic-based practice focused on children and adolescents, particularly those suffering from abuse and experiencing dissociative disorders, his private practice focused on adults. Within this context he developed and offered an intensive, highly individualized, short-term (3 week) residential intervention that combined clinical and spiritual components. He offered these Intensive Soul Care Retreats and trained others to do the same for over 20 years.

Benner was Chief Psychologist at Child and Adolescent Services, Hamilton, Ontario and was named Associate Fellow at the Centre for Studies in Religion and Society, University of Victoria (Victoria, B.C.) in 2008.

== Approach ==
The intersection of psychology and spirituality became his main interest during the 1970s. His general approach was described as a "multidisciplinary analysis of psychological change and spiritual development" that blends "insights from psychology, theology, anthropology, his own clinical practice, and other disciplines." Examining the role of spirituality in clinical practice in 1988, he noted "the chasm that had been dug between professional psychology and spiritual longing", and in 1989, published his views in an article on the nature of spirituality, its role in psychotherapy and a "nonreductionistic understanding of spirituality that situates it within the heart of an individual's psychological being."

A retrospective study of Benner's model of human nature and its implications for educators and counselors, based on his writings since the late 1980s, was published in 2006. A later examination of changes in therapeutic work over two decades included Benner among leading researchers in the field of spirituality. By then, the focus of his writing and teaching was wisdom and the journey toward enlightenment that facilitated access to it. This work drew on a broad base of wisdom traditions, including Christian mysticism, Hermeticism, Indigenous spirituality, depth psychology, and science.

== Publications ==
David G. Benner has authored or edited more than thirty books. Early titles focused on the role of spirituality in clinical practice and were primarily written for psychologists and other mental health professionals. His middle-phase books focused on living the spiritual journey in a deeply human way and the human journey in a deeply spiritual way, and were written from an explicitly Christian perspective. Later books have been written for a more general audience and have continued to focus on the role of spirituality in human spiritual unfolding while drawing on science, philosophy and the perennial wisdom tradition for insights that are helpful in understanding spiritual awakening and enlightenment. These big themes of awakening, becoming fully human, and the possibilities of enlightenment have been at the core of all his books.

In addition to his books, he has also published articles in peer-reviewed journals of psychology in areas such as religious psychodynamics in multiple personality disorder, development of a psychological test for the assessment of marital communication, the psychology of money, and psychological trauma and social healing in Croatia. He also played a seminal role in the creation of a child trauma treatment program.

He was also editor of a reference encyclopedia in psychology and co-editor of a subsequent expanded edition for a readership of pastoral counselors and clergy, as well as editor of a ten-book series on strategic pastoral counseling resources. In a journal addressing the interface of psychology and spirituality, a reviewer wrote of Benner's body of work: "His research plumbs the best of human development psychology and ancient spirituality wisdom.... As a seasoned scholar, author, psychologist and a spiritual director, Benner serves as an expert witness of what healthy and whole humans look like...." His contribution of material for peer professionals continues, and his books have reached a broad general readership. More than two dozen of his titles are in print, and translations have been published in more than twenty languages.

== Selected bibliography ==
- —, ed. (1985). Baker Encyclopedia of Psychology. Grand Rapids, MI: Baker Book House. ISBN 0801008654.
- — (1985). Therapeutic Love: An Incarnational Interpretation of Counselling. Winchester, Hants: Clinical Theology Association. ISBN 0948097000.
- — (1985). Healing Emotional Wounds. Grand Rapids, MI: Baker Book House. ISBN 0801009839.
- — (1988). Psychotherapy and the Spiritual Quest: Exploring the Links Between Psychological and Spiritual Health. Grand Rapids, MI: Baker Book House. ISBN 0801009480.
- — (1991). Counselling as a Spiritual Process. Winchester, Hants: Clinical Theology Association. ISBN 0948097809.
- —; Harvey, Robert W. (1996). Understanding and Facilitating Forgiveness. Grand Rapids, MI: Baker Books. ISBN 0801090199.
- — (1996). Money Madness and Financial Freedom: The Psychology of Money Meanings and Management. Calgary, AB: Detselig Enterprises. ISBN 155059138X.
- — (1998). Free at Last: Breaking the Bondage of Guilt and Emotional Wounds. Belleville, ON.: Essence Publishing. ISBN 1896400841.
- — (1998). Care of Souls: Revisioning Christian Nurture and Counsel. Grand Rapids, MI: Baker Books. ISBN 0801090636.
- —; Hill, Peter C., eds. (1999). Baker Encyclopedia of Psychology and Counseling. Grand Rapids, MI: Baker Books. ISBN 0801021006.
- — (2002). Sacred Companions: The Gift of Spiritual Friendship and Direction. Westmont, IL: InterVarsity Press. ISBN 0830823425.
- — (2003). Strategic Pastoral Counseling: A Short-Term Structured Model. Grand Rapids, MI: Baker Academic. ISBN 0801026318.
- — (2003). Surrender to Love: Discovering the Heart of Christian Spirituality. Westmont, IL: InterVarsity Press. ISBN 0830823026.
- —; Moon, Gary W., eds. (2004). Spiritual Direction and the Care of Souls: A Guide to Christian Approaches and Practices. Westmont, IL: InterVarsity Press. ISBN 0830827773.
- — (2004). The Gift of Being Yourself: The Sacred Call to Self-Discovery. Westmont, IL: InterVarsity Press. ISBN 0830832459.
- — (2005). Desiring God's Will: Aligning Our Hearts With the Heart of God. Downers Grove, Ill: InterVarsity Press. ISBN 978-0830832613.
- — (2010). Opening to God: Lectio Divina and Life as Prayer. Westmont, IL: InterVarsity Press. ISBN 978-0-8308-3542-3.
- — (2011). Soulful Spirituality: Becoming Fully Alive and Deeply Human. Grand Rapids, MI: Brazos Press. ISBN 978-1587432972.
- — (2012). Spirituality and the Awakening Self: The Sacred Journey of Transformation. Grand Rapids, MI: Brazos Press. ISBN 978-1587432965.
- — (2014). Presence and Encounter: The Sacramental Possibilities of Everyday Life. Grand Rapids, MI: Brazos Press. ISBN 9781587433610.
- — (2016). Human Being and Becoming: Living the Adventure of Life and Love. Grand Rapids, MI: Brazos Press. ISBN 978-1587433795.
- — (2019). Living Wisdom. Eugene, OR: Wipf and Stock. ISBN 9781532692147.
- — (2022). I Am The Love That Flows Through Me. Toronto, Canada: Cascadia Living Wisdom Publications. ISBN 978-1-7386557-0-0.
- — (2023). This AND that: Pondering Polarities as a Doorway to Hidden Wisdom. Toronto, Canada: Cascadia Living Wisdom Publications. ISBN 978-1-7386557-1-7.
