= Lindsay Cahill =

Canadian chemist

- Born: Barrie, Ontario, Canada
- Education: McMaster University
- Awards: Banting Research Foundation Discovery Award
- Scientific career
- Workplaces: Memorial University of Newfoundland; McMaster University; Warwick University; Hospital for Sick Children
- Thesis: Solid-state NMR Studies of Lithium Ion Dynamics in Cathode Materials for Lithium Ion Batteries (2008)
- Doctoral advisor: Gillian Goward

Lindsay Cahill is a Canadian chemist who uses Magnetic Resonance Imaging (MRI ) to study metabolic abnormalities in pregnancy. She has published more than 70 articles on her research related to nuclear magnetic resonance in studying electrochemical materials and for imaging animal fetuses and placenta. She has published widely-used protocols for the imaging of mouse brains.

== Education and early career ==
Cahill completed her B.Sc. and Ph.D. in chemistry at McMaster University. In her Ph.D., she used solid-state NMR to study lithium-ion batteries. She employed ^{6}Li and ^{7}Li solid-state NMR to study the dynamics of the transport of lithium ions through materials.

After completing her PhD, she held a postdoctoral fellowship in the Department of Physics at Warwick University under the supervision of Mark Smith (physicist). In 2009, she moved to the Mouse Imaging Center at the Hospital for Sick Children. One of her contributions at the Mouse Imaging Center was the identification of a mouse model for autoimmune encephalomyelitis that may serve as a better model for multiple sclerosis in humans than previous models. Prior to her scientific career, she was a captain in the Barrie Safety Patrol.

== Independent career ==
.Cahill was appointed as an Assistant Professor in the Department of Chemistry at the Memorial University of Newfoundland in January 2020. She received the Discovery Award from the Banting Research Foundation and a Discovery Grant from the Natural Sciences and Engineering Research Council of Canada. In 2022, Cahill was the project leader for a grant from the Canadian Foundation for Innovation to establish the Micro-Ultrasound Lab at Memorial University. She was also named one of the 2022 Future Leaders in Canadian Brain Research Program by the Brain Canada foundation.

== Awards ==
- 2020 Banting Research Foundation Discovery Award
- 2022 Future Leaders in Canadian Brain Research Program
