= List of McMaster University Olympic athletes, coaches and officials =

McMaster University has graduated 35 Olympic athletes, and produced eight Olympic coaches, two Olympic administrators and two Olympic officials.

== McMaster Olympic athletes ==
- C.J. Sylvannus "Syl" Apps '36 (athletics 1936 - Berlin)
- Grey McLeish '37 (rowing 1936 - Berlin)
- Betty (Taylor) Campbell '37 (athletics 1932 - Los Angeles, 1936 - Berlin)
- Catherine (Miller) Ray '38 (athletics 1940 - Tokyo / Helsinki - cancelled due to World War II)
- James Donald McFarlane '53 (athletics 1952 - Helsinki)
- Barry Ager '62 (basketball - Summer Olympics 1960 - Rome)
- Dr. Jack Gauldie '64 (water polo 1972 - Munich)
- Sara (Barber) Jenkins '64 (swimming 1956 - Melbourne, 1960 - Rome)
- Fred Heese '65 (canoe 1964 - Tokyo)
- Tony Powell '67 (athletics 1972 - Munich)
- Marjorie Homer-Dixon '73 (kayak 1968 - Mexico City, 1972 - Munich)
- Steven Mitruk '73 (gymnastics 1968 - Mexico City, 1972 - Munich)
- David Hart '74 (water polo 1972 - Munich, 1976 - Montreal)
- Rick Puglise '74 (water polo 1972 - Munich, 1976 - Montreal)
- Carol Love '75 (rowing 1976 - Montreal)
- George Steplock '76 (water polo - 1972 Munich, 1976 Montreal)
- Paul Pottier '79 (water polo 1976 - Montreal, 1984 Los Angeles)
- Craig Martin '82 (football (soccer) - 1984 - Los Angeles)
- Paula Schnurr '87 (athletics 1992 Barcelona, 1996 - Atlanta)
- Paul Ragusa '97 (wrestling 1996 - Atlanta)
- Larry Cain '89 (canoe 1988 - Los Angeles, 1988 - Seoul, 1992 - Barcelona)
- Andrea (Page) Steen '89 (athletics 1984 - Los Angeles)
- Bill Trayling '89 (canoe 1988 - Seoul - alternate)
- Christopher Woodcroft '89 (wrestling 1988 - Seoul, 1992 - Barcelona)
- Calum McNeil '91 (wrestling - 1992 Barcelona - Competed for the United Kingdom)
- Mark Heese '92 (beach volleyball 1996 - Atlanta, 2000 - Sydney, 2004 - Athens)
- Lawrence Holmes '92 (wrestling 1984 - Los Angeles, 1988 - Seoul)
- Sue Palmer-Komar '92 (cycling 1996 - Atlanta, 2004 - Athens)
- Greg Woodcroft '93 (wrestling 1996 - Atlanta)
- Tim Bethune '95 (athletics 1984 - Los Angeles)
- Gavin Maxwell '95 (canoe 1996 - Atlanta)
- Alan Nolet '96 (gymnastics 1988- Seoul, 1992 - Barcelona, 1996 - Atlanta)
- Janet Cook '02 (swimming 2000 - Sydney - alternate)
- Howard Dell '02 (bobsleigh 1988 - Calgary)
- Joanne Malar '02 (swimming 1992 - Barcelona, 1996 - Atlanta, 2000 - Sydney)
- Adam van Koeverden '07 (kayak 2004 - Athens, 2008 - Beijing)
- Chelsey Gotell '09 (swimming 2004 - Athens, 2008 - Beijing, Paralympics)
- Julia Hanes '17 (para-athletics 2024 - Paris)

Note: Dr. Norman Lane, a McMaster Professor of Mathematics, competed in two Olympic Games (Canoe 1948 - London, 1952 - Helsinki).

== Coaches ==
- Fred Wach (fencing - unknown)
- Nick Cipriano (wrestling - 1988 Seoul, 1992 Barcelona, 1996 Atlanta)
- Dave O'Donnell (fencing - 1988 - Seoul)
- Claus Wolter '80 (rowing - 1988- Seoul)
- Andrew Cole (swimming - 1996 - Atlanta, 2000 - Sydney)
- Gaye Stratten (swimming 1996 - Atlanta)
- Barry Shepley '86 (triathlon - 2000 Sydney)
- Margot (Verlaan) Page '87 (hockey - 2006 Turino)

== Administrators ==
- Doug Howard (wrestling - manager - 1976 - Montreal)
- Martha (Arnott) Deacon '81 (badminton - team leader - 2000 - Sydney)
- Frank Corning 65' (wrestling - manager Olympics, Los Angeles - 1984, Barcelona - 1992, Atlanta - 1996)

== Officials ==
- Dr. Ron Foxcroft '01 (basketball - 1976 - Montreal)
- Janice Deakin '83 (basketball - 1996 - Atlanta)
