= Paul Morris (professor) =

New Zealand academic of religion

Paul Morris, MA McM, PhD Lanc, is a religious studies scholar and an Emeritus Professor at Victoria University of Wellington in New Zealand. He was the Programme Director for Religious Studies at Victoria University of Wellington, and provides regular comment to the media on matters of religious diversity. He is the author of the New Zealand National Statement on Religious Diversity.

== Biography ==
=== Education and professorship ===
Morris was born in Southampton, UK. He studied a B.A. in Religious Studies at Victoria University of Wellington under Professor Lloyd Geering, an MA in Religious Studies at McMaster University in Canada, and a PhD in Religious Studies at Lancaster University where he was supervised by Professor Ninian Smart. He taught at Lancaster from 1980 to 1994, and held various visiting positions, including Visiting Professor of Religious Studies at the University of California, Santa Barbara; Senior Research Fellow at The Centre for Jewish-Christian Relations, Birmingham; Visiting Professor of Humanities, University of Queensland; and Visiting Professor of Religion, Boston University.

In 1994, Morris returned to New Zealand when he was appointed Professor of Religious Studies at Victoria University. He is known for his work on the relationship between religion and dying/death, and religion and personal and cultural identity. He retired in 2018 and was appointed an Emeritus Professor.

=== Other roles ===
Professor Morris was a member of the Faculty of Humanities and Social Sciences Research Committee and a member of the Management Committee of the Asia Studies Institute, former academic vice-president AUS VUW branch and a former elected member of the Arts Faculty Planning Committee. He was the Convener of the review panel for the Review of Social Work and a member of the Council Working Party on Academic Quality.

Paul Morris has been a member of the British Association for the Study of Religions, and is a former president and conference committee member of the New Zealand Association for the Study of Religions. He is a member of the American Academy of Religion (Section Chair 1998-2003), the International Association for the History of Religions (member of the Executive Committee 2000-2005), and is on the editorial boards of Numen, Implicit Religions, Postscripts, and Beliefs and Values. He is co-editor of the journal Human Rights Research.

Morris talks on religion on the Radio New Zealand program Nights.

=== National Statement on Religious Diversity ===
A keen participant in the New Zealand Diversity Action Programme, Morris is the author of the National Statement on Religious Diversity, which includes a foreword by then Prime Minister Helen Clark. The statement has been the subject of controversy in relation to its assertion that "New Zealand has no official or established religion."
