= George Gilmour =

Canadian academic (1900–1963)

Reverend George Gilmour B.A., M.A., Ph.D.

7th Chancellor of McMaster University
- In office 1941–1949
- Preceded by: Howard P. Whidden
- Succeeded by: E. Carey Fox

1st President and Vice-Chancellor of McMaster University
- In office 1949–1961
- Preceded by: Position Created
- Succeeded by: Harry Thode

Personal details
- Born: March 14, 1900 Hamilton, Ontario
- Died: July 12, 1963 (aged 63) Hamilton, Ontario
- Education: McMaster University; Oxford University; Yale University
- Occupation: Academic administration
- Profession: Professor, clergy
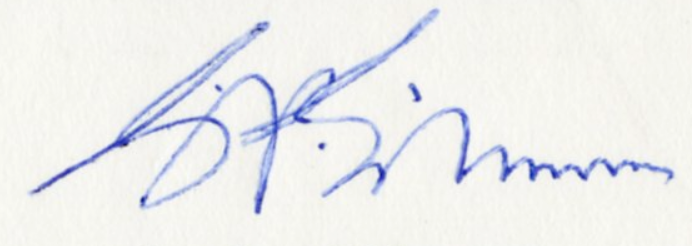
- Signature

George Peel Gilmour B.A, M.A, Ph.D. (March 14, 1900 – July 12, 1963) was a Canadian university president. He was the youngest chancellor of McMaster University, serving from 1941 to 1949, then serving under the title of president and vice-chancellor until 1961. Gilmour Hall, the building containing the office of the president and the office of the registrar at McMaster University, is named after him.

Born in Hamilton, Ontario, Canada, he received three degrees from McMaster and did post-graduate work at Oxford and Yale.

During his lifetime, he held positions in the Baptist Convention in Ontario and Quebec and was president of the Canadian Council of Churches from 1946 to 1948.

Gilmour also served as Chair of the Board of Royal Botanical Gardens (Ontario) between 1945 and 1965.

He was named citizen of the year by the City of Hamilton in 1950, and was inducted into Hamilton's Gallery of Distinction in 1987. Gilmour received eight honorary degrees, and was named Hamilton's Man of the Year in 1950.

== McMaster career ==
Gilmour started as a professor of history at McMaster, taking the Chair of Church History in 1920.

During his tenure as president, Gilmour oversaw the construction of nine buildings on McMaster's main campus, including the McMaster Nuclear Reactor and McMaster Divinity College.

== Degrees Received ==
- B.A, B.Th, B.D. – 1921 – McMaster University
- M.A, PhD – McMaster University
- M.A, M.D. – Yale University
