= Premier University =

Private university in Chittagong, Bangladesh

- প্রিমিয়ার বিশ্ববিদ্যালয়
- Seal of Premier University
- Other name: PU
- Motto: Centre of excellence for quality learning
- Type: Private
- Established: 21 January 2002; 24 years ago
- Chairman: Shahadat Hossain
- Chancellor: President Mohammed Shahabuddin
- Vice-Chancellor: S. M. Nasrul Quadir
- Academic staff: 340 [2017]
- Administrative staff: 260 [2017]
- Students: 7,551 [2017]
- Undergraduates: 5,895 [2017]
- Postgraduates: 1,107 [2017]
- Other students: 41 [2017]
- Location: Chittagong, Bangladesh; 22.3606°N 91.8288°E
- Campus: Urban
- Language: English
- Affiliation: University Grants Commission of Bangladesh
- Website: puc.ac.bd

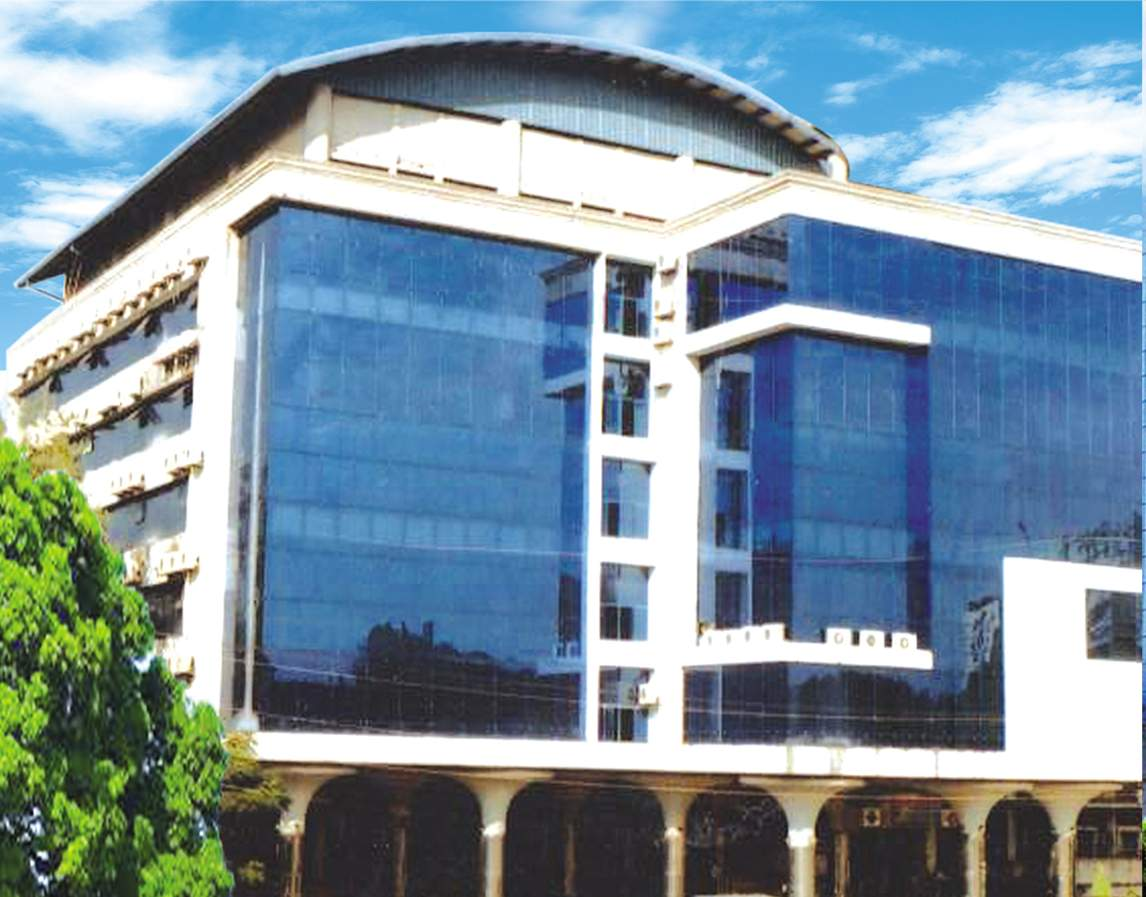
PU campus-03

Premier University (Bengali: প্রিমিয়ার বিশ্ববিদ্যালয়) is a private university in Chittagong, Bangladesh. It was established in 2002 by the Chattogram City Corporation and continues to operate under its authority.

== History ==
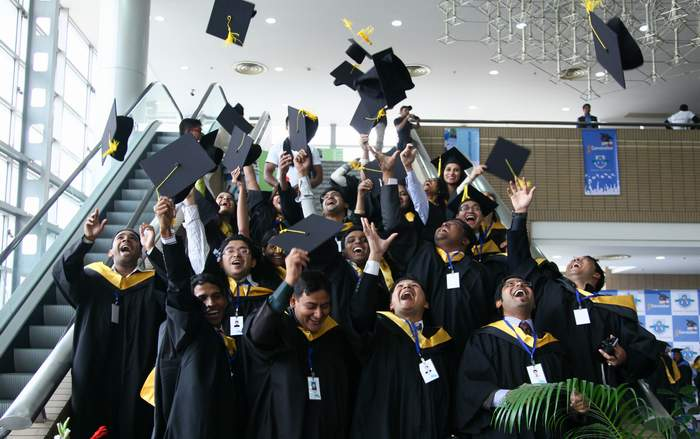
Students enjoying the first convocation of Premier University

The ex-mayor of Chattogram City Corporation, ABM Mohiuddin Chowdhury, first proposed the establishment of a higher education institution in 1998. A project proposal for Premier University was submitted to the Ministry of Education in May 2001. Approval was granted under the Private University Act (1992), and the University Grants Commission (UGC) approved the university curriculum.

Premier University officially began on 5 December 2001 and launched academic programs in January 2002. During 2022, the university held its third convocation.

In 2012, the university received initial approval for a permanent campus from the UGC. In 2021, it was granted formal approval from the Ministry of Education to establish and operate from its permanent campus, becoming the first private university in Chittagong to obtain this recognition.

In December 2024, Vice-Chancellor Anupam Sen resigned following several days of student protests demanding administrative reform. The pro-vice-chancellor, treasurer, proctor, and student welfare cirector also resigned.

Premier University currently consists of six faculties and thirteen departments.

== Campus ==
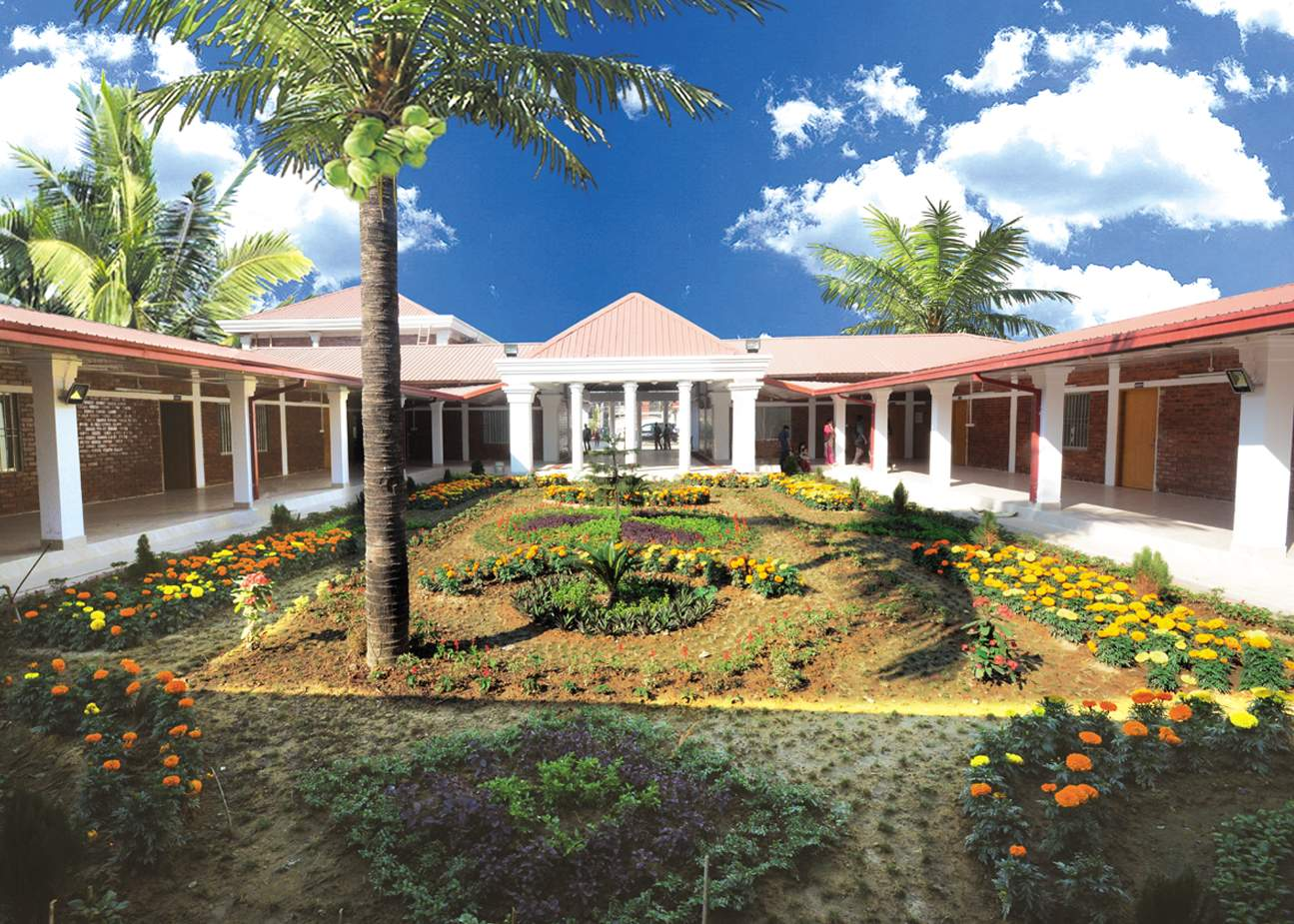
PU campus

The university's permanent campus is located at: 541, O.R. Nizam Road, Panchlaish, Chittagong.

The university also operates an additional campus at: 1/A, O.R. Nizam Road, Prabartak Circle, which hosts the American Corner Chattogram.

=== Academic buildings ===
Premier University operates through several academic buildings located across the city:

- Academic Building #1 (Permanent Campus): Located at 1/A, O.R. Nizam Road, Panchlaish. It houses the main administrative offices and central facilities.
- Academic Building #2 & NX-2: Located at Prabartak Circle (West of Badnasha Mazar). It hosts various undergraduate and graduate programs.
- Academic Building #3: Located at WASA Circle, Dampara. It houses the Faculty of Business Studies (BBA/MBA), and the departments of Mathematics, Fashion Design, and Architecture.
- Academic Building #4: Located at 44, Hazari Lane, Kotwali. It houses the departments of Computer Science and Engineering (CSE), Electrical and Electronic Engineering (EEE), Law, and Economics.
- Academic Building #5: Located at 541, O.R. Nizam Road, GEC Circle. It houses the departments of English, Sociology, and Public Health, and serves as the university's central admission office.

=== Laboratories ===
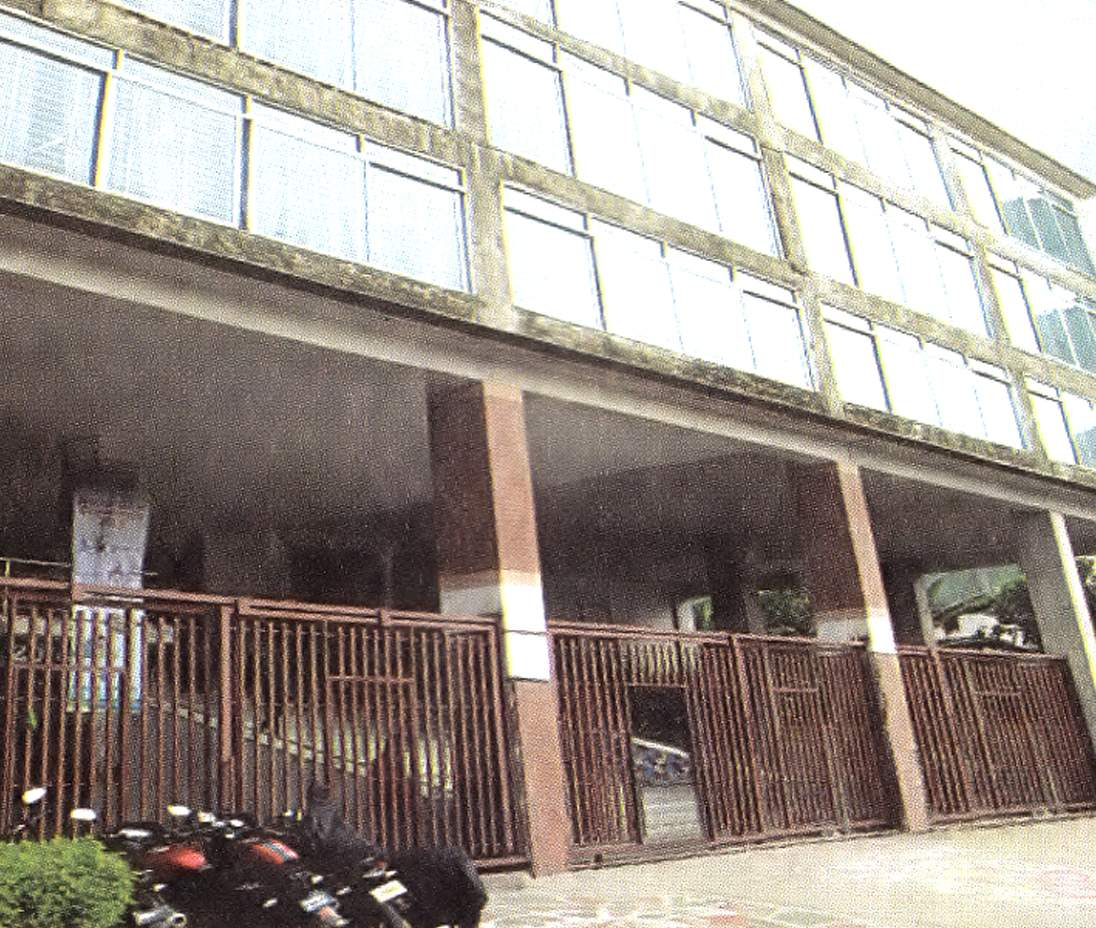
Law Campus - Hazari Lane

- Computer Labs
- Circuits & Electronics Lab
- Machines and Power System Lab
- Communication and Microprocessor Lab
- Design Studio
- PLC Lab
- Physics Lab
- Chemistry Lab
- Simulation Lab
- Switchgear & Protection Lab

== Organization and administration ==
Premier University is managed under the authority of the Chattogram City Corporation.

=== Vice-Chancellors ===
- Anupam Sen (2006–2024)
- S. M. Nasrul Quadir (2024–present)

== Academics ==
=== Faculty of Business Studies ===
The faculty has five departments: Department of Accounting, Department of Finance, Department of Human Resource Management, Department of Management, and Department of Marketing. It offers the following undergraduate and postgraduate degrees:

- Bachelor of Business Administration (BBA)
- Master of Business Administration (MBA)
- Executive Master of Business Administration (EMBA)

=== Faculty of Law ===
==== Department of Law ====
The department of Law offers the following undergraduate and postgraduate degrees:

- Bachelor of Law (LLB)
- Master of Law (LLM) 1 Year

=== Faculty of Engineering ===
The Faculty of Engineering consists of the following departments:

==== Department of Architecture ====
B.Sc. in Architecture.

==== Department of Computer Science and Engineering ====
The department was established in 2002. The department offers the following degrees

- B.Sc. in Computer Science & Engineering
- M.Sc. in Computer Science & Engineering

==== Department of Electrical and Electronic Engineering ====
The department offers the following degree

- B.Sc. in Electrical & Electronic Engineering

=== Faculty of Arts ===
The Faculty of Arts consists of the following departments:

==== Department of English ====
The department of English offers the following degrees:

- Bachelor of Arts (Honors) in English (BA in English)
- Master of Arts in English (MA in English)

==== Department of Bengali Language and Literature ====
The department of Bangla offers the following degrees:

- Bachelor of Arts (Honors) in Bangla (BA in Bangla)
- Master of Arts in Bangla (MA in Bangla)

==== Department of Fashion Design and Technology ====
- Bachelor of Arts in Fashion and Technology

==== Department of Information Science and Library Management ====
- Post Graduate Diploma in Library and Information Science

=== Faculty of Science ===
The Faculty of Science consists of the following departments:

==== Department of Mathematics ====
The department offers the following degrees:

- Bachelor of Science (Hons.) in Mathematics
- M.Sc. in Mathematics - 1 Year [Date of approval: 7/7/2019]

==== Department of Public Health ====
The department offers the following degrees:

- Master of Public Health

==== Department of Chemistry ====
The department offers the following degrees

- B.Sc. in Chemistry

==== Department of Health Science ====
The department offers the following degrees

- MS in Molecular-Biology and Bio-Informatics Date of Approval: 30-01-2024

=== Faculty of Social Sciences ===
The Faculty of Social Sciences consists of the following departments:

==== Department of Sociology and Sustainable Development ====
The Department of SSD offers the following degrees:

- Bachelor of Social Science (Honors) in Sociology and sustainable development
- M.S.S in Sociology and Sustainable Development Date of Approval: 13/12/2022

==== Department of Economics ====
The Department of Economics offers the following degrees:

- Bachelor of Social Science (Honors) in economics
- Master of Social Science in economics

== Clubs and organizations ==
Premier University hosts a variety of student clubs encouraging both academic and extracurricular engagement.

=== List of student clubs ===
- IEEE Premier University Student Branch
- PUC Robotics Club
- Premier University Computer Club (PUCC)
- Business Entrepreneurs Club
- Career Club
- Sports Club – run by the PU Sports Development Committee
- Debating Club
- Language Club
- Photography Club
- Cultural Club
- Premier University Mooting Society

== Achievements ==
Premier University has achieved recognition in academics, engineering accreditation, and national competitions.

- The EEE Department is accredited by BAETE (IEB), recognized under the Washington Accord.

Major student achievements include:

- Qualification for ICPC Asia West Continent Championship
- Champion – 14th Inter-University Programming Contest 2020
- 2nd Place – Ada Lovelace National Girls' Programming Contest 2020
- Bangladesh Zonal Winner – IIT Techfest Bombay 2019–2020
- Champion & Runner Up – NASA Space Apps Challenge 2018 (Chittagong Division)
- Hearth Spirit of the year 2025, Stetson IMCCC BD National Round (Department of Law)
- Spirit of the Jessup 2020 (Department of Law)

== Global alliances ==
American Corner Chattogram was established in 2003 and reopened in 2023 in partnership with Premier University. It offers EducationUSA advising, innovation workshops, technology resources, and cultural programs.

It is located at the Premier University campus at 1/A, O.R. Nizam Road, Prabartak Circle, Panchlaish, Chittagong.
