= List of presidents of the University of British Columbia =

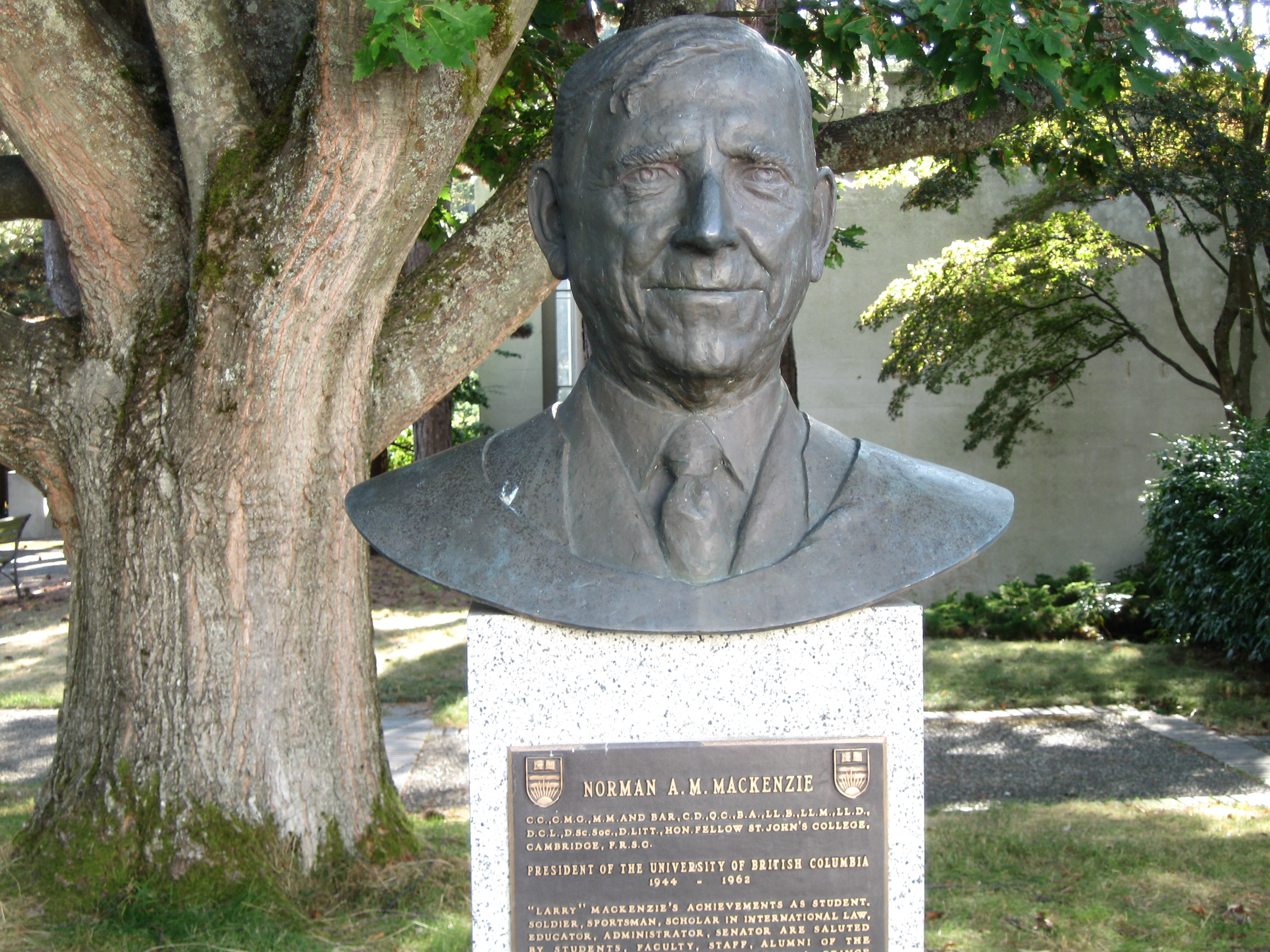
A sculpture of Norman MacKenzie, at University of British Columbia, Vancouver, British Columbia, Canada

The President and Vice-Chancellor of the University of British Columbia (UBC) serves as the administrative head of the institution.

There have been fifteen people have served as president in the history of the institution, including those that held the position on an interim basis, with Martha C. Piper serving twice as president.

Although David H. Farrar served as the university's interim president and vice chancellor from 1 July to 14 August 2016, unlike other interim (pro tem) presidents, the university did not include him in the official numbering of past presidents.

== List of presidents ==
No.	Name	From	To	Notes	Ref.
1	Frank Wesbrook	1913	1918		
2	Leonard Klinck	1919	1944		
3	Norman MacKenzie	1944	1962		
4	John B. Macdonald	1962	1967		
5	Fredrick Kenneth Hare	1968	1969		
6	Walter Harry Gage	1969	1975		
7	Douglas T. Kenny	1975	1983		
8	George Pedersen	1983	1985		
9	Robert H. T. Smith	1985	1985	Pro tem	
10	David W. Strangway	1985	1997		
11	Martha C. Piper	1997	2006		
12	Stephen J. Toope	2006	2014		
13	Arvind Gupta	2014	2015		
14	Martha C. Piper	2015	2016	2nd time	
– (Note: Although David H. Farrar served as the university's interim president and vice chancellor from 1 July to 14 August 2016, unlike other interim presidents, the university did not include him in the official numbering of past presidents.)	David H. Farrar	2016	2016	Interim	
15	Santa J. Ono	2016	2022		
16	Deborah Buszard	2022	2023	Interim	
17	Benoit-Antoine Bacon	2023	present		

== See also ==
- List of chancellors of the University of British Columbia
- List of University of British Columbia people
