= Takashi Ono =

Takashi Ono may refer to:

- Takashi Ono (mathematician) (小野孝, 1928–2026), Japanese-American mathematician
- Takashi Ono (gymnast) (小野喬, born 1931), Japanese gymnast
- Takashi Ono (judoka) (小野卓志, born 1980), Japanese judoka
- Takashi Ono (composer) (小野貴史, born 1971), Japanese composer
- Takashi Ono (politician) (小野孝, born 1903), Japanese politician

== See also ==
- Takashi Ohno, American politician
