= Bourns =

Bourns may refer to:

- Arthur Bourns (1919–2015), chemistry professor and university administrator
- Frank Swift Bourns (1866–1935), ornithologist and doctor
- Bourns College of Engineering, Riverside, California, U.S.
- Bourns, Inc., American electronics corporation
