= Benoit-Antoine Bacon =

Canadian neuropsychologist

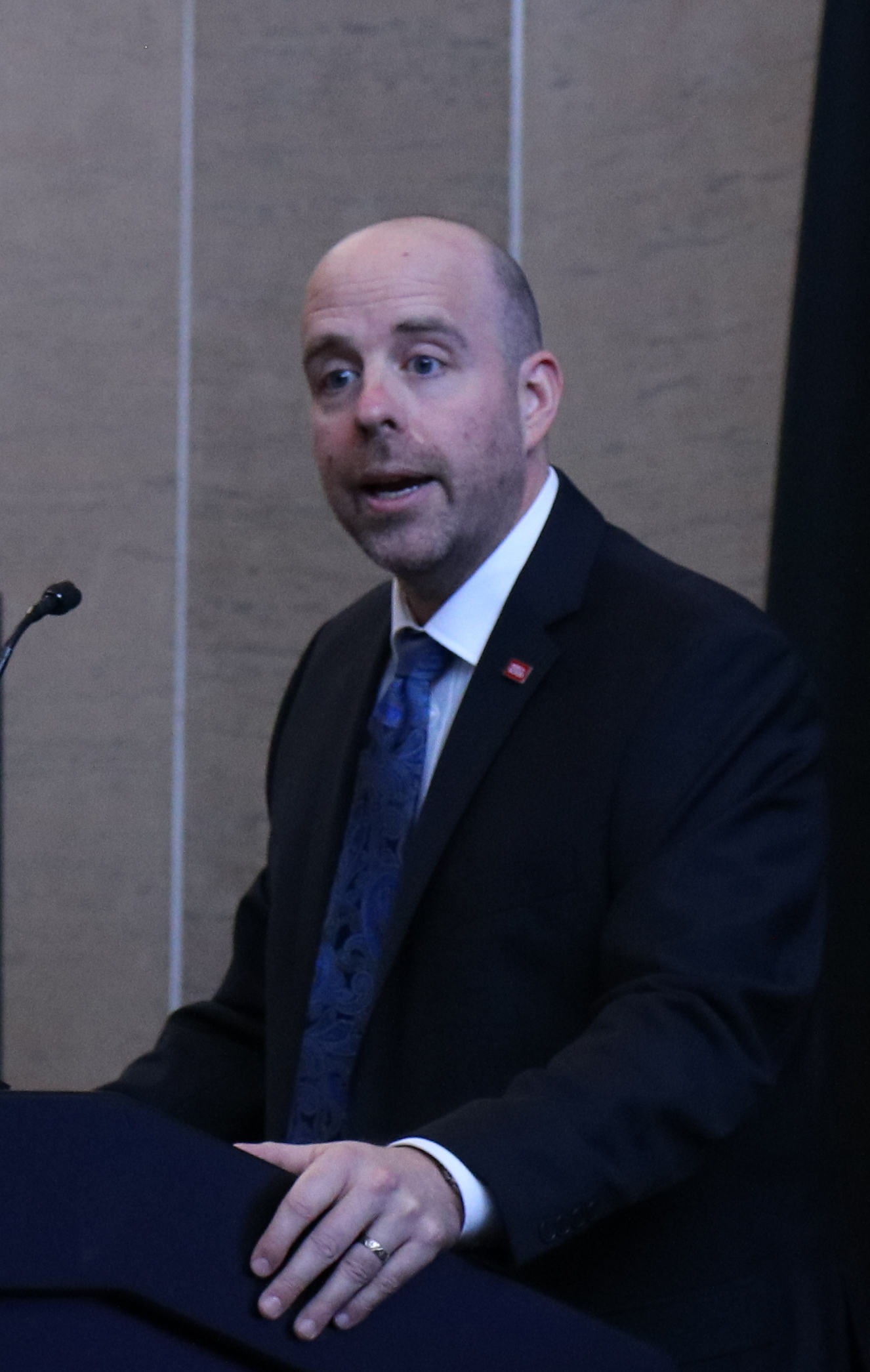
- Bacon in 2018

17th President of the University of British Columbia
- Incumbent
- Assumed office November 1, 2023
- Chancellor: Steven Point; Judy Rogers
- Preceded by: Deborah Buszard (acting)

15th President of Carleton University
- In office July 1, 2018 – August 31, 2023
- Chancellor: Yaprak Baltacioğlu
- Preceded by: Alastair Summerlee (acting)
- Succeeded by: Jerry Tomberlin (acting)

Personal details
- Born: Montreal, Quebec, Canada
- Education: Concordia University (BA); Université de Montréal (MA, PhD)
- Scientific career
- Fields: Neuropsychology
- Workplaces: Bishop's University; Concordia University; Queen's University at Kingston; Carleton University; University of British Columbia
- Thesis: Etudes des substrats neurologiques de la stéréopsie chez le chat (1999)
- Doctoral advisors: Franco Lepore; Jean-Paul Guillemot

Benoit-Antoine Bacon is a Canadian neuropsychologist who has been serving as the 17th president of the University of British Columbia since November 2023. He previously served as the 15th president of Carleton University in Ottawa, Ontario, from 2018 to 2023.

== Early life and education ==
Born in Montreal, he graduated from Concordia University in Montreal, Quebec with a B.A. (Honours) degree in psychology in 1995. He received his Ph.D. in neuropsychology from the Université de Montréal in Montreal, Quebec in 1999, and completed a post-doctoral fellowship at the University of Glasgow in Glasgow, Scotland.

== Career ==
His first academic appointment was in the Department of Psychology at Bishop's University in Sherbrooke, Quebec. Following serious labour strife at Bishop’s, he was asked to serve as Chief Negotiator for the union and led the settlement of several collective agreements. He later served as Chair of Psychology, Dean of Arts and Science, and Associate VP Research at the institution.

In 2013, he was hired as Provost and Vice-President (Academic Affairs) at his alma mater Concordia University. In 2016, he moved to Ontario to serve as Provost and Vice-President (Academic) at Queen's University.

On May 1, 2018 he was announced as the 15th President of Carleton University in Ottawa, succeeding interim President Alastair Summerlee. He began his mandate on July 1, 2018, at the same time as Carleton Board Chair Nik Nanos. Together they announced Yaprak Baltacioğlu as the 12th Chancellor of the institution in December 2018.

On July 20, 2023, Dr. Bacon was announced as the 17th President and Vice-Chancellor of the University of British Columbia, with his term to begin on November 1, 2023. Bacon's term as President and Vice-Chancellor of Carleton University ended on August 31, 2023. He was succeeded by Jerry Tomberlin as interim President and Vice-Chancellor.

UBC's 2025 financial disclosure showed that Bacon was among the university's top 10 earners, with more than $725,000 in salary and compensations.

== Personal life ==
To contribute to breaking down the stigma around mental health and substance use, Bacon has shared his difficult upbringing in a dysfunctional family and subsequent challenges in early adulthood.

Academic offices
Preceded by Alastair Summerlee (interim)	15th President and Vice-Chancellor of Carleton University; 2018–2025	Succeeded by Jerry Tomberlin (interim)
Preceded by Deborah Buszard (interim)	17th President and Vice-Chancellor of the University of British Columbia; 2025–present	Incumbent
