= David H. Farrar =

David Farrar

8th President and Vice Chancellor of McMaster University
- In office July 1, 2019 – July 1, 2025; Acting: July 1, 2019 – July 1, 2020
- Chancellor: Santee Smith
- Preceded by: Patrick Deane
- Succeeded by: Susan Tighe

President and Vice Chancellor of the University of British Columbia
- Acting; July 1, 2016 – August 14, 2016
- Chancellor: Lindsay Gordon
- Preceded by: Martha Piper
- Succeeded by: Santa J. Ono

Personal details
- Education: University of Toronto (BS, MS); University of Western Ontario (PhD)
- Scientific career
- Fields: Chemistry
- Workplaces: University of Toronto; University of British Columbia; McMaster University
- Thesis: Crystallographic and Spectroscopic Studies on n2-Alkyne Complexes (1979)
- Doctoral advisor: Nicholas Payne

David H. Farrar is an academic and former university administrator, who served as the eighth President and Vice-Chancellor of McMaster University from 2019 to 2025. Farrar served as professor of chemistry and an academic administrator at the University of Toronto from 1981 to 2007 and the University of British Columbia from 2007 to 2017. From July 1 to August 14, 2016, Farrar briefly served as the interim president of University of British Columbia. In 2017, Farrar joined McMaster University, serving as its Provost and Vice President of Academics, before being named the university's interim president on July 1, 2019 for a one year term. However, in December 2019 McMaster named Farrar as its official president, with his first formal term beginning on July 1, 2020.

== Early life ==
Farrar received his Bachelor of Science in 1975 and his Master of Science in 1976 from the University of Toronto. Farrar then pursued his doctorate at the University of Western Ontario, receiving his doctorate in 1980. After receiving his doctorate, he served as a postdoctorate fellow at Cambridge University.

== Career ==
Farrar was employed by the University of Toronto's Department of Chemistry in 1981, later serving as the chair of the department from 1999 to 2002. In 2003, he was appointed the university's Vice Provost Students, managing student activities, affairs, and enrolment. He was later named the university's Deputy Prevost in 2004.

In 2007, Farrar joined the University of British Columbia (UBC) as its Provost and Vice President of Academics until 2015. During his time, he also served as a professor for the university's chemistry department. From 2015 to June 2016, when the university was transitioning through presidents, Farrar served as the Advisor to the Interim President, at the request of outgoing UBC president, Arvind Gupta. Farrar later succeeded Martha Piper as the Interim President and Vice-Chancellor of UBC, serving the position from July 1 to August 14, 2016. He stepped down from the position when Santa J. Ono was ready to take office as UBC's permanent president on 15 August. After stepping down, Farrar took a period of academic leave, before returning to his previous position in the university's Department of Chemistry.

Farrar joined McMaster University as its Provost and Vice President of Academics in 2017. On July 1, 2019, Farrar was named as the university's interim president for one year, replacing outgoing president Patrick Deane. During this time, a selection committee conducted a nine-month search for a permanent president which included candidates from around the world. Deane served as a consultant to the committee during this process. However, in December 2019, the university's Board of Governors and its Senate instead opted to formally name Farrar as the institution's eighth president; on a five-year term that formally began on July 1, 2020.

As of 2019, Farrar has co-authored over 80 technical papers and holds five patents. As a professor, he has also supervised over 25 graduate students and postgraduate fellows.

== Notes ==
Academic offices
Preceded by Martha Piper (interim)	President of the University of British Columbia (interim); July 1, 2016 – August 14, 2016	Succeeded by Santa J. Ono
Preceded by Patrick Deane	8th President of McMaster University; July 1, 2020 – present	Incumbent
