= Nik Nanos =

Canadian opinion pollster, entrepreneur, public speaker and author

- Born: Nikita James Nanos; 1964 (age 61–62)
- Website: nanos.co

Nikita James "Nik" Nanos CM (born 1964) is a Canadian public opinion pollster, entrepreneur, public speaker, author, and expert in political, business and social trends.

== Early life and education ==
The son of Greek immigrants, he grew up in Trenton, Ontario, attending Dufferin Public School and Prince Charles Public School with one year at Trenton High School. With the sudden death of his father, he moved to Oshawa, Ontario and attended O'Neill Collegiate and Vocational Institute, where he was the Poet Laureate in his final year of high school. He attended Queen's University in Kingston, Ontario, where he earned undergraduate degrees in history and political studies and a Master of Business Administration. He also undertook PhD-level studies at the University of Nottingham School of Politics and International Relations.

He founded SES Canada Research Inc., the precursor of Nanos Research, as an undergraduate student at Queen's University. While at Queen's, he was President of the Queen's Debating Union, where he represented Queen's in Canada, the United States, and at the National and World Universities Debating Championship in extemporaneous parliamentary debating.

In 2023, he was appointed a research adjunct Professor at the Norman Paterson School of International Affairs (NPSIA) at Carleton University. Between 2008 and 2021, he was a Research Associate Professor at the State University of New York (SUNY Buffalo) specializing in US–Canada relations.

Nanos is currently a Global Fellow at the Woodrow Wilson International Center for Scholars in Washington, D.C., conducting research on populism and energy politics, a Senior Fellow at the University of Ottawa's Collaboratory on Energy Research and Policy and an Executive Fellow at the School of Public Policy at the University of Calgary.

Nanos has also been elected a Fellow and Chair of Board of the Canadian Research and Insights Council (CRIC), and holds a Certified Management Consulting (CMC) designation.

== Career ==
Nanos is Chairman of the Nanos Research Group of Companies and is business partners with his brother John Nanos, who is also a graduate of Queen's University.

At the beginning of his career, his firm conducted a controversial riding survey that predicted Peter Milliken (later to become the Speaker of the House of Commons of Canada), a relatively unknown Liberal federal candidate in the riding of Kingston and the Islands, would defeat senior Progressive Conservative Cabinet Minister Flora Macdonald in the 1988 Canadian federal election. He also pioneered publicly released nightly election tracking in 2004 with the Cable Public Affairs Channel and has conducted nightly tracking in every federal election in Canada since that time. In the 2006 Canadian federal election, his results were within one tenth of one percent for all the major parties – a first in Canadian polling history.

The Nanos Research Group of Companies includes Nanos-dimap Analytika, an analytics and targeting research practice, which is a joint venture with dimap, a research organization in Germany. Nik also leads the team behind the Nanos Bloomberg Canadian Confidence Index, which monitors consumer confidence in the Canadian economy and whose data is streamed to Bloomberg News terminals every week.

His analysis and insight have appeared in The Economist, The Wall Street Journal, Bloomberg News, Reuters, The Guardian, the BBC and all of Canada's major media outlets. He is the pollster of record for The Globe and Mail, and CTV News. He is a regular contributor to The Globe and Mail with his monthly column, "Data Dive", and has a weekly segment on CTV News Channel, "Nanos on the Numbers", which profiles the latest political, social, and business trends.

Nanos founded Nanos Research while an undergraduate student at Queen's University. Since that time, he has built a reputation for polling reliability and insight. He conducted all the research for Staples Business Depot in Canada as it expanded from 19 to 225 stores. He is a regular expert for Bell Media on telecommunications regulatory issues before the Canadian Radio-television and Telecommunications Commission and has conducted numerous due diligence research projects for KPMG's Mergers and Acquisition practice. Nik has also been an expert for reputation and trademark litigations for clients such as Staples, Adidas, PepsiCo, Heineken, Bodum, and IMAX.

Nanos has been named one of the Top 100 most influential people in government and politics in Canada in 2021 by The Hill Times and is a regular public speaker at conferences.

His research focuses on the application of supervised and unsupervised machine learning algorithms and the integration of large-scale behavioural and sentiment datasets.

He is the author of The Age of Voter Rage, which explores populist politics and how small swings in voter sentiment and computational propaganda influence democratic outcomes in the United States, Canada, the UK, and France. Nanos was also a contributing writer for the book Tactical Reading: A Snappy Guide to the Snap Election 2017, which explores the landscape in the 2017 United Kingdom general election.

On June 20, 2025, Carleton University installed Nanos as its 13th Chancellor, effective July 1st of the same year.

== Service and philanthropy ==
Nanos was the 2006–2007 National President of the Marketing Research and Intelligence Association (MRIA).

During his tenure as National President, he presided over the launch of the Charter of Respondent Rights, the renewal of the marketing research industry's professional designation, and a review of the standards regulating market and public opinion research in Canada.

He served as the chair of the Board of Governors of Carleton University between 2018 and 2020, and presided over the installation of Chancellor Yaprak Baltacioğlu and President Benoit-Antoine Bacon.

Nanos was also appointed as an Honorary Captain in the Royal Canadian Navy.

With an interest in advancing and supporting journalism, Nanos led the creation of the G. Stuart Adam Award in Journalism, which gives outstanding Master of Journalism students at Carleton the means to go out into the field, across Canada or abroad, to produce their capstone Master's Research Project. Nanos also established the Commander of the Royal Canadian Navy Scholarship, which is awarded annually to an outstanding graduate student enrolled at the Norman Paterson School of International Affairs specializing in Security and Defense Studies, with a focus on the Royal Canadian Navy and/or the Canadian Armed Forces. He also created the Indigenous Enriched Support Program School Mentorship Fund at Carleton University. He is a regular supporter through research of the Canadian Journalists for Free Expression, which works to defend and protect the right to free expression in Canada and around the world. Nanos is a past Chair of the Government of Ontario's Constable Joe Macdonald Public Safety Officers Survivors' Scholarship Fund, which assists the families of police and public safety officers killed in the line of duty with the costs of post-secondary education.

Nanos has served as the 69th President of the Rideau Club of Canada.

Nanos currently serves on the Board of The Hellenic Initiative Canada, a registered charity which funds programs in Greece that secure food for children and provide access to health care for all.

He is a member of the Canadian Order of the American Hellenic Educational Progressive Association.

He was appointed as a Member of the Order of Canada in 2023, "[f]or his committed leadership in the market research and public opinion industry."
