= Veronica Vaida =

Romanian-American chemist

- Born: 3 August 1950 (age 76); Bucharest, Romanian People's Republic
- Education: Yale University; Brown University; University of Bucharest
- Known for: Atmospheric chemistry Aerosols
- Awards: E. Bright Wilson Award (2011)
- Website: www.colorado.edu/chemistry/veronica-vaida

Veronica Vaida (born August 3, 1950) is a Romanian-Hungarian-American chemist and professor at the University of Colorado Boulder. She is an expert in environmental chemistry and aerosols.

== Early life and education ==
Vaida was born in Bucharest. Her parents were Hungarians from Transylvania and met after World War II. Her mother, Elza Katz, survived an Auschwitz concentration camp and her father Vasile Vaida was a political prisoner. She attended a Hungarian school in Cluj and moved back to Bucharest in 1963. She studied chemistry at the University of Bucharest. After seeing a US position advertised in 1969, she moved to Brown University, working on detectors for molecular beams. She joined Yale University for her postgraduate studies in 1973, but struggled to find an academic mentor because the male academics thought organic chemistry was "unsuitable for women". Her original mentor was Geraldine A. Kenney-Wallace, who left to set up the first ultrafast spectroscopy lab at the University of Toronto. She eventually obtained her Ph.D. from Yale University in 1977.

== Career ==
In 1977 Vaida became a Xerox postdoctoral fellow at Harvard University, working alongside Dudley R. Herschbach and Bill Reinhart on photoreaction dynamics. She collaborated with Kevin Peters and Meredith Applebury at Bell Labs. She was made a member of the faculty at Harvard University in 1978. In 1980 she was appointed an Alfred P. Sloan Foundation Fellow and a Camille and Henry Dreyfus scholar in 1984. Vaida developed jet cooled absorption spectrometry to analyse the lifetimes of reactive systems, where excited state dynamics were complicated because of diffuse absorption and limited fluorescence. She worked on an excimer laser that could allow her group to study transition metal complexes. She moved to the University of Colorado Boulder, where she built her own spectroscopy lab. She identified the excited state of OCIO with Susan Solomon in 1989. After collaborating with Susan Solomon, Vaida recognised that her studies of model compounds could be useful in atmospheric chemistry. Her group went on to study atmospheric ozone, water clusters and polar ice. She divorced Kevin Peters in 1990.

In 1994 she was awarded an Erskine fellowship at the University of Canterbury in New Zealand. She worked on the overtones of OH vibrations using a cavity ring down spectrometer. She went on to study organic fragments on aerosol particles. She hypothesised that aerosol coagulation and division permitted organics to form a surfactant layer on top of the aerosol and recognised that this was similar to single cell bacteria.

Her group began to study organic films at aerosol water-air interfaces, using surface reflection infrared spectroscopy to examine differences in phenylalanine ionisation in the bulk and at the water surface. Vaida's Ph.D. student, Elizabeth Griffith, found that peptide bonds at the surface of water would be generated nonenzymatically. In 2007 she was appointed distinguished lecturer at Sigma Xi Distinguished Lecturer University of Colorado Boulder. She studied how sunlight can abiotically provide the prebiotic reactions essential for the evolution of life. In 2018 the Journal of Physical Chemistry A published a tribute to Vaida and her research.

=== Awards and fellowships ===
- 2004 – Fellow of the American Association for the Advancement of Science
- 2004 – Fellow of the American Physical Society
- 2004 – Fellow of the Radcliffe Institute for Advanced Study
- 2004 – Fellow of the John Simon Guggenheim Memorial Foundation
- 2011 – American Chemical Society E. Bright Wilson Award
- 2020 – American Chemical Society Irving Langmuir Award in Chemical Physics
- 2020 – Member of the National Academy of Sciences

== Personal life ==
She married Kevin Peters, a colleague in the chemistry department at Harvard University in 1978. They divorced in 1990. In 1993 she met Adrian Tuck, a chemist at the National Oceanic and Atmospheric Administration Atmospheric Lab. They married in 1997.
