= Martha Piper =

Canadian academic administrator

Martha C. Piper
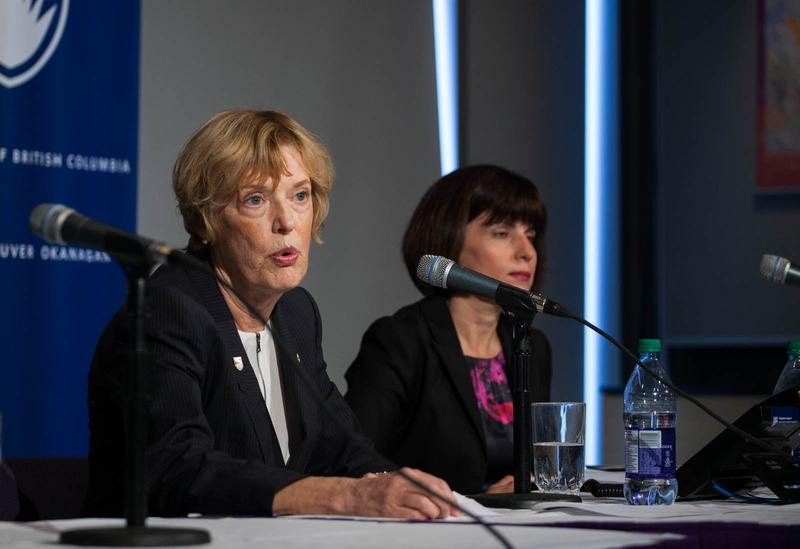
- Piper (left) in 2015

President and Vice-Chancellor, University of British Columbia
- In office 1997 – July 1, 2006
- Preceded by: David Strangway
- Succeeded by: Stephen Toope

Interim President and Vice-Chancellor, University of British Columbia
- In office September 1, 2015 – June 30, 2016
- Preceded by: Arvind Gupta
- Succeeded by: David H. Farrar

Personal details
- Born: November 27, 1945 (age 80) Lorain, Ohio, U.S.
- Education: University of Michigan; University of Connecticut; McGill University
- Occupation: Academic administrator

Martha C. Piper OC OBC is a Canadian academic administrator who was the president and vice-chancellor of the University of British Columbia (UBC) from 1997 until 2006. She was the 11th person and the first woman to serve as president of UBC. Having been born in Lorain, Ohio, she is also the first person born outside Canada to have held the position. She is a Canadian citizen and was made an officer of the Order of Canada in 2002. Her contract with UBC stipulated a salary of $350,000 plus incentive payments of up to $50,000 per year upon meeting the performance goals set by the Board of Governors.

Stephen Toope replaced Piper as president of UBC on July 1, 2006. In August 2015, UBC announced that Piper had been appointed as interim president, to serve from September 1, 2015, to June 30, 2016, while "the university conducts a comprehensive, global search for a new leader" following the sudden resignation of Toope's successor Arvind Gupta. Santa J. Ono was later selected to serve as UBC's fifteenth president and vice-chancellor.

Piper currently sits on numerous boards in Canada, including for the Bank of Montreal, Shoppers Drug Mart and the Dalai Lama Center for Peace and Education.

== Education and career ==
Piper holds a BS in physical therapy from the University of Michigan (1967), an MA in child development from the University of Connecticut (1970) and a PhD in epidemiology and biostatistics from McGill University (1979).

After completing her PhD, Piper was the director of McGill's School of Physical and Occupational Therapy until 1985, when she became the dean of the University of Alberta's Faculty of Rehabilitation Medicine. In 1993, she was made the University of Alberta's vice-president of Research, and also External Affairs starting in 1995. Upon becoming president of the University of British Columbia (UBC) in 1997, Piper inherited a strong record of external fundraising and research development from her predecessor, David Strangway. She was able to capitalize on significant federal government reinvestment in research and innovation, effectively using UBC's position as the largest university in Western Canada to attract large amounts of government and private-sector funding. While building this research legacy, she also left a legacy of debt for her successor, Stephen Toope.

== Trilateral Commission ==
The Georgia Straight reported on August 24, 2006, that Piper has become a member of the Trilateral Commission, an organization of influential private citizens founded in 1973 at the initiative of banker David Rockefeller.

== Academic honours and awards ==
- BSc degree with academic distinction
- MA
- PhD
- DSc (Honorary), May 1998, McGill University
- LLD (Honorary), May 1999, Dalhousie University
- LLD (Honorary), November 2001, University of Toronto
- DSc (Honorary), October 2002, University of Western Ontario
- LLD (Honorary), December 2003, the University of Melbourne
- LLD (Honorary), October 2005, the University of Saskatchewan
- LLD (Honorary), June 2006, University of Alberta
- LLD (Honorary), June 2006, University of Victoria
- LLD (Honorary), October 2008, Simon Fraser University
- LLD (Honorary), 2006, St. Francis Xavier University
- LLD (Honorary), 2006 University of Calgary
- Doctorat (Honorary), 2006 Université de Montréal
- DSc (Honorary), 2006 McMaster University
- LLD (Honorary), 2007 University of Northern British Columbia
- LLD (Honorary), 2007 University of British Columbia
- LLD (Honorary), 2007 University of Windsor
- Honorary Fellow of Merton College, Oxford

Academic offices
Preceded by David Strangway	President of the University of British Columbia; 1997–2006	Succeeded by Stephen Toope
Preceded by Arvind Gupta	President of the University of British Columbia; 2015–2016 (interim)	Succeeded by David H. Farrar (interim)
