= George Connell (biochemist) =

Canadian academic (1930-2015)

George Connell OC FRSC

12th President of the University of Toronto
- In office 1984–1990
- Chancellor: George Ignatieff; John Black Aird
- Preceded by: David Strangway
- Succeeded by: Robert Prichard

6th President and Vice-Chancellor of the University of Western Ontario
- In office 1977–1984
- Preceded by: D. Carlton Williams
- Succeeded by: Alan K. Adlington (acting)

Personal details
- Born: George Edward Connell; June 20, 1930 Saskatoon, Saskatchewan, Canada
- Died: March 13, 2015 (aged 84) Toronto, Ontario, Canada
- Education: University of Toronto
- Scientific career
- Fields: biochemistry
- Workplaces: University of Toronto
- Thesis: Aspects of gamma-glutamyl transpeptidation reactions ( 1956)

George Edward Connell, OC FRSC (June 20, 1930 – March 13, 2015) was a Canadian professor and academic administrator.

Born in Saskatoon, Saskatchewan, Connell studied at Upper Canada College in Toronto and graduated in 1947. He then attended the University of Toronto, earning a BA in biochemistry in 1951 and a PhD in 1955.

Connell worked at the University of Toronto for the next 22 years, first as a professor of biochemistry and then as the chairman of the department of biochemistry. His research included the study of plasma cholinesterase. He left to serve as President of the University of Western Ontario from 1977 to 1984, before returning to the University of Toronto to become its twelfth President from 1984 to 1990.

In 1987, Connell was made an Officer of the Order of Canada. He served as a principal advisor to the Royal Commission of Inquiry on the Blood System in Canada (known as the Krever Inquiry) established in 1993. Connell died on March 13, 2015.
