= Alan K. Adlington =

Canadian academic and economist

President and Vice-Chancellor of the University of Western Ontario
- Acting; 1984–1985
- Preceded by: George Connell
- Succeeded by: George Pedersen

Personal details
- Born: Alan Kenneth Adlington; January 30, 1925
- Died: September 30, 2017 (aged 92)
- Occupation: economist

Alan Kenneth Adlington (January 30, 1925 – September 30, 2017) was a Canadian academic and economist who was acting president of the University of Western Ontario from 1984 to 1985. He also served in the capacity of vice-president administration, and later as the Ontario Deputy Minister of Colleges and Universities. He was formerly the chief financial officer and administrative officer at the University of Waterloo. Adlington was a veteran of World War II and an alumnus of the University of Western Ontario, where he earned a bachelor's degree in economics.
