= Douglas T. Kenny =

7th President of the University of British Columbia
- In office 1975–1983
- Preceded by: Walter Harry Gage
- Succeeded by: George Pedersen

Personal details
- Born: October 20, 1923 Victoria, British Columbia, Canada
- Died: June 1996 (aged 72)
- Occupation: University president, Professor

Douglas Timothy Kenny (October 20, 1923 – June 1996) served as the seventh President of the University of British Columbia in Vancouver, British Columbia, Canada from 1975 to 1983.

== Biography ==
Douglas T. Kenny was born in Victoria, British Columbia, Canada, in 1923. He attended Victoria College. He received a B.A. and an M.A. from the University of British Columbia, followed by a PhD from the University of Washington. In 1950, he became a lecturer at UBC, then full professor in 1964 and Chair of the Department of Psychology in 1970, then Dean of Arts in 1970. He served as the seventh President from 1975 to 1983. From 1983 to 1988, he taught Psychology again at UBC.

He served as member of the Governing Board of the Canada Council from 1975 to 1978, and the Social Sciences and Humanities Research Council of Canada from 1978 to 1983.

He died in June 1996. The Psychology building at UBC has been named after him.

== Bibliography ==
- The Mission of the University of British Columbia (1979)
