= Peter George (professor) =

Canadian economist

Peter George CM, O.Ont

6th President and Vice-Chancellor of McMaster University
- In office July 1, 1995 – June 30, 2010
- Preceded by: Geraldine A. Kenney-Wallace
- Succeeded by: Patrick Deane

Personal details
- Born: September 12, 1941 Toronto, Ontario, Canada
- Died: April 27, 2017 (aged 75)
- Spouse(s): Gwendolyn Scharf (?-1997); Allison Barrett (1998-2017)
- Education: University of Toronto (BA, MA, PhD)
- Occupation: Academic administration
- Profession: Economist

Peter James George, CM, O.Ont (September 12, 1941 – April 27, 2017) was a Canadian economist and university administrator. On June 30, 2010, he retired after serving three five year terms as President and Vice-Chancellor of McMaster University in Hamilton, Ontario.

== Accomplishments ==
Born in Toronto, Ontario, George graduated from the University of Toronto Schools and received a Bachelor of Arts degree in 1962, a Master of Arts degree in 1963, and a Ph.D. in 1967 from the University of Toronto. He joined McMaster University as a lecturer in 1965. In 1967, he became an assistant professor, associate professor in 1971, and a professor of economics in 1980. From 1974 to 1979, he was associate dean of graduate studies and from 1980 to 1989 was dean of social sciences. He was appointed president of McMaster on July 1, 1995 and served three five-year terms. He retired on June 30, 2010, and was replaced by Patrick Deane, formerly of Queen's University.

From 1991 to 1995, he served a term as president of the Council of Ontario Universities.

In 1999, he was made a Member of the Order of Canada.

George was also a trustee of the University of Sharjah in the United Arab Emirates, as well as the chair of the Hamilton chapter of the United Way. In October 2007 Peter George was named honorary Lt.Col. of 705 (Hamilton) Communication Squadron, a reserve signals unit in the Canadian Forces.

In December 2007, Peter George was made a Member of the Order of Ontario.

== Personal life ==
George's first wife, Gwendolyn Scharf, died of cancer in 1997. In 1998 he married Allison Barrett, and in 2008 they adopted a daughter from China.

On April 27, 2017, George died following an illness.

== Contract controversy ==
According to Maclean's Magazine, Peter George was Ontario's highest paid university president and received over $500,000 in salary and taxable benefits in 2007. The executive of the McMaster University Faculty Association (MUFA) passed a resolution in late June 2008 that raised questions about the appropriateness of some of the specifics of President George's post-retirement payments in the form of research leaves and expressed concerns about the secrecy that seems to have characterized the process involved in his controversial contract.

The contract, meant to remain confidential, provides George with a $1.4 million retirement allowance, to be paid over 14 years. The payments are to be made at the rate of $99,999 per year, which was $1 below the threshold that would require the payments to be reported publicly under salary-disclosure legislation in place when the contract was signed. In 2006 Ontario Universities became subject to Freedom of Information legislation, and the Hamilton Spectator newspaper applied to request release of the contract; the university fought for two years to prevent this release until it finally provided the newspaper with the contract in 2008.

In a Hamilton Spectator article in March 2010, the paper stated that George considered attempting to hide the retirement bonus from disclosure to be "the most foolish thing he did in office". According to George, "I take full responsibility for the stupidity of converting my post-retirement allowances into a figure that was seen quite clearly as an attempt to avoid public disclosure."

== Publications ==
George has a number of publications to his credit in his academic career, including two books:

- Government Subsidies and the Construction of the Canadian Pacific Railway (New York : Arno Press, 1981) ISBN 0-405-13757-5
- The Emergence of Industrial America: Strategic Factors in American Economic Growth Since 1870 (Albany : State University of New York Press, 1982) ISBN 0-87395-578-1 (hard cover), ISBN 0-87395-579-X (paperback)

Academic offices
Preceded by Geraldine Kenney-Wallace	President and Vice-Chancellor of McMaster University; 1995–2010	Succeeded by Patrick Deane
