= Santa Ono =

Canadian-American immunologist (born 1962)

Santa Ono FCAHS
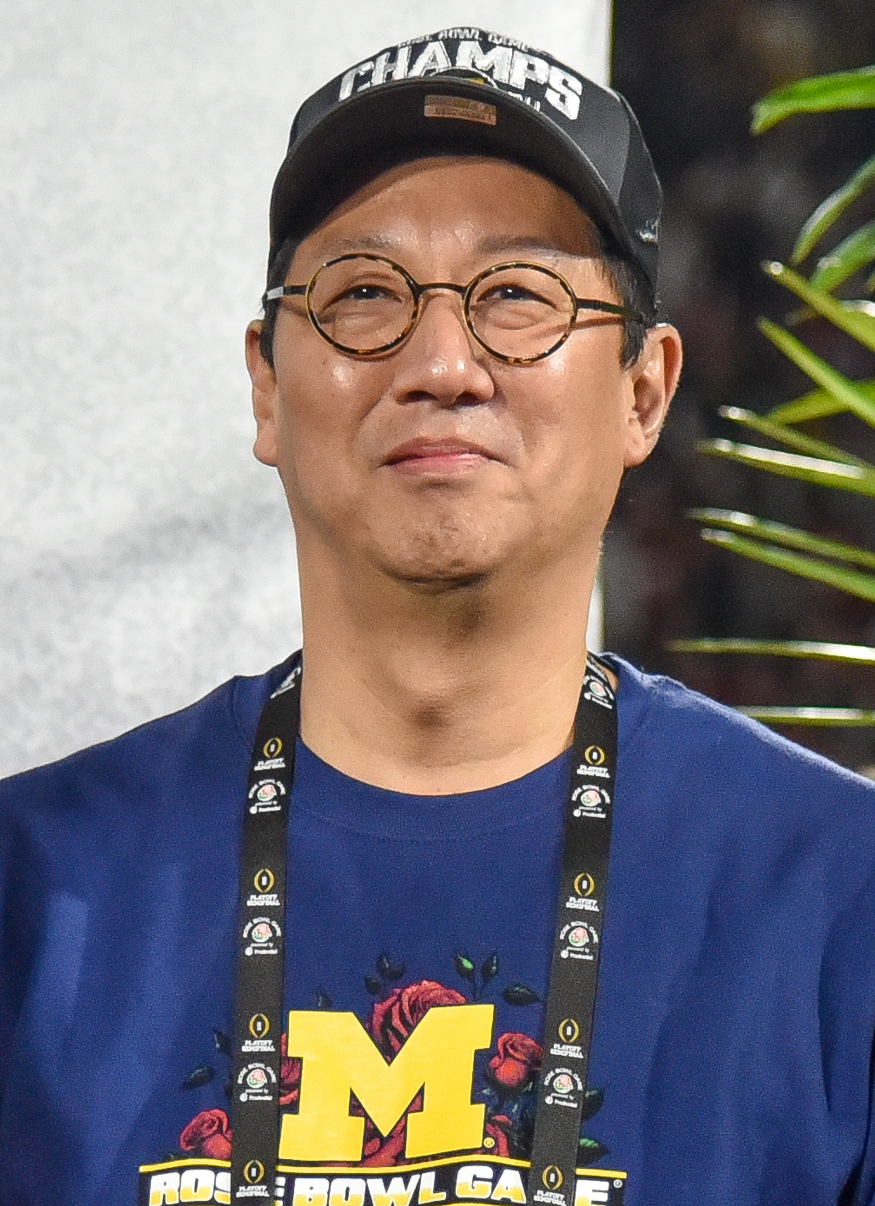
- Ono in 2024

15th President of the University of Michigan
- In office October 14, 2022 – May 6, 2025
- Preceded by: Mary Sue Coleman (interim)
- Succeeded by: Domenico Grasso (interim)

15th President of the University of British Columbia
- In office August 15, 2016 – October 13, 2022
- Chancellor: Lindsay Gordon; Steven Point
- Preceded by: Martha Piper (acting)
- Succeeded by: Deborah Buszard (acting)

28th President of the University of Cincinnati
- In office August 2012 – July 2016
- Preceded by: Gregory H. Williams
- Succeeded by: Beverly J. Davenport (acting)

Personal details
- Born: Santa Jeremy Ono; November 23, 1962 (age 63) Vancouver, British Columbia, Canada
- Citizenship: United States; Canada
- Spouse: Wendy Yip (m. 1989)
- Children: 2
- Relatives: Takashi Ono (father); Ken Ono (brother)
- Education: University of Chicago (BA); McGill University (PhD)
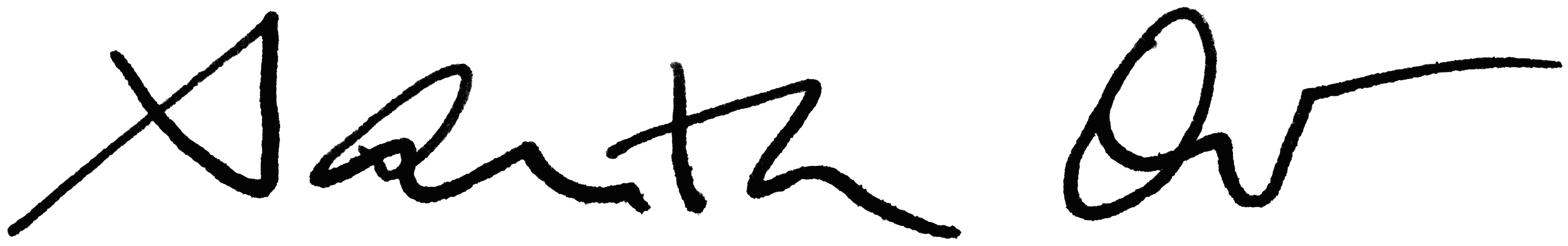
- Signature
- Scientific career
- Fields: Immunology; experimental medicine
- Workplaces: University College London; Emory University; University of Cincinnati; University of British Columbia; University of Michigan
- Thesis: Major histocompatibility complex association of insulin-dependent diabetes in the BB rat (1991)
- Doctoral advisors: Abraham Fuks; Ronald Guttmann

Santa Jeremy Ono FCAHS (Japanese: 小野 三太; born November 23, 1962) is a Canadian-American immunologist.

Ono served in a variety of roles, including as the 15th president of the University of Michigan from October 2022 to May 2025, as the 15th president of the University of British Columbia from 2016 to 2022, and as the 28th president of the University of Cincinnati from 2012 to 2016. Ono was selected to serve as the 14th president of the University of Florida in May 2025, but was rejected in early June by the Florida Board of Governors for the position.

In August 2025, Ono was appointed president of the global division at the Ellison Institute of Technology, Oxford Limited, a private limited company incorporated in November 2021 in England. He would be responsible for assisting John Bell, the company's president, in expanding its local science programs and overseeing its global affairs.

== Early life and education ==
Born in 1962, Santa Ono is the son of Japanese mathematician Takashi Ono, who immigrated to the United States from Japan in the late 1950s. Ono was born in Vancouver, British Columbia, Canada, where his father worked as an assistant professor of mathematics at the University of British Columbia from 1961 to 1964. Ono has United States citizenship and Canadian citizenship.

Ono was raised in Philadelphia, Pennsylvania, and Towson, Maryland, where his father worked as a faculty member at the University of Pennsylvania from 1964 to 1969 and at Johns Hopkins University from 1969 to 2011, respectively. His older brother is Momoro Ono and his younger brother is Ken Ono.

Ono received a Bachelor of Arts degree with a major in biological sciences from the University of Chicago in 1984 and a Doctor of Philosophy degree in experimental medicine from McGill University in Canada in 1991.

== Career ==
At University College London, Ono served as associate dean of students and as a member of the University College London Council. In June 2006, Ono was named to the newly created post of vice provost for academic initiatives at Emory University in Atlanta, Georgia.

=== University of Cincinnati ===
In June 2010, Ono was named senior vice president for academic affairs and provost at the University of Cincinnati.

In 2012, Ono was named the 28th president of the University of Cincinnati in Ohio, becoming the first Japanese-American president of that university. U Square at the Loop, a US$78 million mixed-use development, was opened during his presidency. In January 2015, Inside Higher Ed named Ono as "the nation's most notable college president for 2015".

On July 19, 2015, Samuel DuBose, a Black unarmed motorist who was not affiliated with the university, was fatally shot by a University of Cincinnati police officer after DuBose was stopped off-campus for driving a car without a front license plate. It sparked widespread protests for many days with some being arrested. In January 2016, on the condition of Ono's formal apology, the university reached a US$4.85 million civil settlement with the family of Samuel DuBose.

=== University of British Columbia ===
On June 15, 2016, Ono was named the 15th president and vice chancellor of the University of British Columbia in Canada, effective August 15. He was re-appointed for a second five-year term on August 11, 2020.

In February 2017, Ono reinstated John Furlong as keynote speaker for a university fundraiser despite allegations of Furlong's abuse of Indigenous children during his time as a teacher in a remote community. Furlong's participation sparked protests from UBC students and activists, including some of his alleged victims. This incident led to the resignation of the only Indigenous member of UBC's Sexual Assault Policy Committee. Ono's decision to reinvite Furlong followed reported pressure from wealthy donors.

In June 2018, Ono's social media presence was noted by The Ubyssey, the official UBC student newspaper, as lacking a clear distinction between his personal views and university policies, leading to ambiguity and sometimes prompting clarification from the university's Public Affairs.

In July 2019, Amazon announced plans to establish Canada's first "Cloud Innovation Centre" at UBC. The project proceeded without community consultation. Contract details were withheld until a student group obtained them through a freedom of information request. The documents showed that the Ono administration followed Amazon's directive to keep the CA$3 million funding for the use of university technology confidential.

In October 2019, at least six students were given medical attention for suspected drugging incidents at a fraternity party. Following this, a female professor faced online abuse after criticizing the fraternities involvement in Remembrance Day ceremonies. However, the university administration, under the Ono presidency, responded and emphasized freedom of expression rather than condemning the harassment against the professor, affirming its "commitment to freedom of expression and academic freedom".

During Ono's tenure, the university hosted multiple controversial speakers promoting white supremacist, Islamophobic, and neo-Nazi movements, often invited by student groups with extreme views. Ono inaccurately claimed equal community support for an anti-trans speaker event, leading to the Vancouver Pride Society's decision in July 2019 to ban UBC's participation in the Vancouver Pride Parade.

=== University of Michigan ===
On July 13, 2022, Ono was named as the 15th president of the University of Michigan, with his term beginning on October 13, 2022. He became the first Japanese-American to lead the university. In October 2023, Ono received a 4% raise in base salary, increasing it from US$975,000 to US$1,014,000 annually.

Under the Ono presidency, the university conducted a renovation of the President's House, the official residence of the university president, from 2022 to 2023 at a cost of US$11.5 million.

During Ono's March 2023 address, he stated that DEI would be a major focus of his presidency. In response to a donor's request for clarification on how the university spent money on DEI programs in 2023, Ono wrote, "I'm very proud of what has been accomplished and I'm excited about what's going to happen with DEI 2.0". In January 2024, the university was reported to have 241 employees in the Diversity, Equity, and Inclusion (DEI) offices, with payroll costs totaling more than US$30 million annually. On March 27, 2025, citing the Trump administration's executive order, Ono reversed his previous DEI policies and shut down the university's DEI programs and offices.

In May 2023, Ono spent US$575,000 to purchase a house in the far Detroit suburb of West Bloomfield Township in Oakland County, about 45 miles from Ann Arbor, despite his contract requiring residency in the President's House. The Chronicle of Higher Education reported that Ono was often absent from campus and "missed numerous executive-officer-council meetings", which led to "a leadership void and squabbles in some cases". Ono stated in his primary residence tax exemption affidavit to the state of Michigan that he spends "100%" of his time at the Oakland County address, which he also used for voter registration and his driver's license. After he told the local newspaper The Detroit News in June 2024 that he lived in Oakland County only on occasional weekends or holidays, questions about his residency prompted a review by the local tax assessor, who in August found nothing against Ono's sworn affidavit of having his "only primary residence" in Oakland County instead of Ann Arbor. The result aligned with concerns raised in the media about his failure to fulfill his contractual obligation to reside in the President's House in Ann Arbor, as his predecessors had done.

On October 17, 2024, the university's Board of Regents voted unanimously to extend Ono's contract by an additional eight years, through October 1, 2032. The extension also increased Ono's base salary to US$1.3 million per year, a 33% rise since he started his tenure two years before. Media reported that he used Florida's 2024 offer to get this pay increase.

On January 10, 2025, Ono shut down the University of Michigan's two-decade-long partnership with Shanghai Jiao Tong University in China since 2005, terminating the UM–SJTU Joint Institute as well as the dual-degree and study-abroad programs.

On May 4, 2025, the day after giving a speech as the president on the University of Michigan's spring commencement, Ono announced through a campus email that he became the sole finalist for the presidency of the University of Florida and decided to leave Michigan. Ono submitted his resignation letter to the chair of the Board of Regents on the same day, resigning from all university employment, including his faculty position. On May 5, Rebekah Modrak, chair of the university's Faculty Senate, said that many professors had complained that Ono's campus emails seemed to have been written by ChatGPT. Katherine White, the chair of the Board of Regents, accepted Ono's resignation in writing on May 6. Ono's tenure as president at the University of Michigan was the shortest of all past presidents. The University of Michigan Board of Regents appointed Domenico Grasso, the then-chancellor of the University of Michigan–Dearborn, as the university's interim president on May 8. Media reports noted that Ono did not comply with the clause in his contract that required him to give six-month advance notice of his voluntary resignation.

On June 27, 2025, Ono was sued as a defendant in a federal civil class action in the United States District Court for the Eastern District of Michigan in Detroit by a group of female college athletes. They alleged that the Ono administration allowed an athletics coordinator to continue coaching and conceal his identity from students after learning that he had hacked into their accounts and stolen personal photos. The coordinator was indicted on 24 charges in federal court in March 2025, and the Federal Bureau of Investigation said that the hacking affected "more than 3,000 student-athletes", most of whom were women.

==== Response to labor union protest ====
On March 7, 2023, the Graduate Employees' Organization 3550, a labor union representing graduate student instructors at the university, disrupted the ceremonial procession during Ono's inauguration. On March 29, after negotiations broke down, the majority of GEO 3550 members went on strike, demanding a salary increase from US$24,000 to US$38,000. On April 5 and April 10, respectively, Chief Judge Carol Kuhnke of the Washtenaw County Trial Court denied the Ono administration's request for a temporary restraining order and a preliminary injunction to suspend the strike.

On April 20, 2023, GEO members confronted Ono at a restaurant in Ann Arbor and blocked his car from leaving. Two protesters were arrested. GEO later accused the Ono administration of invented false grades for students in classes taught by striking GEO members. The institutional accreditor Higher Learning Commission investigated and later dismissed those accusations. As the strike extended into the spring, Ono reduced his attendance at campus events and his social media activity. The strike ended on August 25, 2023, right before the start of the fall 2023 semester, when the Ono administration and GEO reached an agreement.

==== Israeli–Palestinian conflict ====
On October 10, 2023, Santa Ono condemned Hamas and called it "terrorists" through a campus statement. On October 13 afternoon, around 300 University of Michigan students and community members protested outside the President's House, objecting to Ono's statement and criticizing Ono's views on Palestinian people, casualties, and forced displacement. Ono responded with an additional statement to the university community on the same day, reaffirming his stance. In November, 40 pro-Palestinian students were arrested during a sit-in demonstration outside Ono's office. In December, Ono canceled the central student government's campus-wide voting on two resolutions related to the Israeli–Palestinian conflict.

On April 30, 2024, United States Representative Virginia Foxx, in her official capacity as chair of the United States House Committee on Education and the Workforce, called Santa Ono to a congressional hearing scheduled for May 23 on "antisemitic college chaos". On May 21, Ono cited fire safety reasons and sent police to clear the pro-Palestinian encampment on The Diag in front of the Hatcher Graduate Library. The encampment was first set up on April 22 to protest for divestment from Israel. Four protesters were arrested. Afterward, the United States House Committee on Education and the Workforce changed Ono's congressional testimony format to transcribed interviews instead of having him appear before the full congressional committee as initially expected.

On October 10, 2024, a Michigan's local Muslim group filed a federal complaint with the United States Department of Education against the university for creating a "racially hostile environment" for Arab students. The complaint cited a leaked audio recording of president Ono discussing the "unbalanced" political pressure to crack down on antisemitism on campus, but not on Islamophobia. On January 30, 2025, the Ono administration suspended the Students Allied for Freedom and Equality, a pro-Palestinian student group on campus, for two years, citing violations of university policy.

On February 3, 2025, Ono was sued as a defendant in a federal lawsuit in the United States District Court for the Eastern District of Michigan by the American Civil Liberties Union of Michigan and the Sugar Law Center for Economic and Social Justice for banning individuals who sought to engage in pro-Palestine protests from campus, including all public areas, and for threatening them with trespassing charges. The lawsuit accused Ono of unconstitutionally punishing protesters and suppressing their First Amendment right to free speech and their Fourteenth Amendment right to due process.

=== University of Florida ===
On May 4, 2025, while serving as the 15th president of the University of Michigan, Ono became the sole finalist for the presidency post at the University of Florida. His May 4 resignation from all employment at the University of Michigan was accepted in writing on May 6. At Ono's request, the American Association of Colleges and Universities removed his previous signature on May 7 from an April 22 open letter jointly signed by more than 660 university and college leaders nationwide in opposition to "government intrusion" in higher education. On May 8, Ono published an opinion article titled "Why I Chose the University of Florida" in Inside Higher Ed, in which he criticized DEI policies he had previously implemented at Michigan, praised Florida's values, and described the UF presidency as "the extraordinary opportunity".

On May 27, 2025, the University of Florida Board of Trustees voted unanimously to select Ono as the incoming 14th president of the University of Florida, pending ratification from the Florida Board of Governors (the governing body of the State University System of Florida). Ono's draft contract with Florida included a total compensation package exceeding US$3 million per year, including a $1.5 million base salary, $500,000 for chairmanship at UF Health, more than $400,000 performance bonuses, $500,000 annual raises, and extra retention incentives.

On June 3, 2025, Ono's hire was rejected by the Florida Board of Governors in a 10–6 vote. This decision came after a three-hour-long meeting between the board and Ono, which included discussions on Ono's support of "race-based hiring, holistic admissions, DEI and climate activism." His candidacy had been questioned by national conservatives including Christopher Rufo and Donald Trump Jr., the latter of whom referred to Ono as a "woke psycho" who "might be a perfect fit for a Communist school in California". While it was reported that many of the members of the board disagreed with each other over Ono's beliefs in these and other areas, some were "praising [Ono's]...shift towards conservative values." Media noted that progressive critics saw Ono's actions as a betrayal, conservatives questioned the sincerity of his ideological turnaround, and some viewed his conversion as opportunistic.

=== United Kingdom ===
On August 18, 2025, the Ellison Institute of Technology, Oxford Limited, a private limited company incorporated in November 2021 in Littlemore district, Oxford city, England, announced the appointment of Ono as president of its global division. Ono would be responsible for assisting John Bell, the president of the company, in expanding its local science programs and overseeing its global affairs.

== Awards ==
On April 8, 2016, on his one-day visit to Chiba University in Japan as the president of the University of Cincinnati to discuss future collaboration opportunities between the two institutions, Ono received an honorary doctorate from the Japanese university. On December 10, 2020, while serving as the UBC president, Ono received an honorary doctor of divinity degree from the Vancouver School of Theology of the University of British Columbia.

In 2017, Ono received a Professional Achievement Award from the University of Chicago Alumni Association. While serving as the UBC president, he was elected as a fellow of the Canadian Academy of Health Sciences in September 2017 and as a member of the American Academy of Arts and Sciences in April 2022. While serving as the president of the University of Michigan, he was elected as a member of the National Academy of Medicine of the United States in October 2024.

== Personal life ==
Santa Ono was named after Santaro, a Japanese folk story character. Ono, a practicing Anglican, is a member of the Anglican Communion Science Commission and served as a lay Eucharistic minister.

Ono met Gwendolyn "Wendy" Yip at McGill University in 1985; Yip was then an undergraduate student, and Ono was a graduate student. The pair married in 1989 and have two daughters together.

Wendy Yip received a Bachelor of Science with a major in immunology from McGill University in 1988 and a Juris Doctor from Boston University in 1991. Her father is Gar Lam Yip (叶嘉林), a Chinese-Canadian professor of electrical and computer engineering at McGill University, and her mother is Alice Chan-Yip (陈敏娜), a Chinese-Canadian pediatrician based in Montreal and former board member with the Montreal Chinese Hospital (满地可中华医院).

Academic offices
Preceded by Gregory H. Williams	28th President of the University of Cincinnati; 2012–2016	Succeeded by Beverly Davenport (interim)
Preceded by David H. Farrar (interim)	15th President and Vice-Chancellor of the University of British Columbia; 2016–2022	Succeeded by Deborah Buszard (interim)
Preceded by Mary Sue Coleman (interim)	15th President of the University of Michigan; 2022–2025	Succeeded by Domenico Grasso (interim)
