= Susan Tighe =

Professor of Civil engineering

9th President and Vice Chancellor of McMaster University
- Incumbent
- Assumed office July 1, 2025
- Chancellor: Santee Smith
- Preceded by: David H. Farrar

Personal details
- Born: 1970 (age 55–56)
- Spouse: Christopher Raymond (m. 1997)
- Education: Queen's University at Kingston (BSc); University of Waterloo (MSc, PhD)

Academic background
- Thesis: An Integrated Model to Assess Asphalt Cement Quality on Low-Temperature Performance and Life Cycle Cost (2000)

Academic work
- Discipline: Civil engineer
- Institutions: University of Waterloo; McMaster University

Susan Louise Tighe (born 1970) is a Canadian civil engineer. She is the President and Vice-Chancellor of McMaster University and former Provost at McMaster and deputy Provost at the University of Waterloo. She is a Fellow of the Canadian Academy of Engineering and the Canadian Society of Civil Engineers. In 2014, she was amongst the inaugural cohort of inductees to the College of New Scholars, Artists and Scientists of the Royal Society of Canada.

== Early life and education ==
Tighe was born in 1970. She was raised in the Catholic faith and attended Georges Vanier Secondary School and graduated from Notre Dame Catholic Secondary School. Following high school, she graduated with a Bachelor of Science in chemical engineering from Queen's University at Kingston in 1993, and spent nearly four years at the Ministry of Transportation of Ontario in Toronto and London. Tighe then returned to school for her Master of Science in Engineering and PhD at the University of Waterloo.

== Career ==
=== Waterloo ===
Following her PhD, Tighe joined the faculty in the Department of Civil and Environmental Engineering at the University of Waterloo in 2000. Upon joining the faculty, she focused her research in the engineering and transportation sectors and sat on the Transportation Association of Canada and various Transportation Research Board committees. In 2004, she received the Engineering Medal for a Young Engineer from Ontario Professional Engineers for being "a researcher, teacher and practitioner who has achieved international recognition" and was a "beacon for women in engineering and a leader in civil engineering." The following year, Tighe accepted two new appointments that advanced her research into the field. She first became a Tier 2 Canada Research Chair in Pavement and Infrastructure Management to fund her research into minimizing damage to civil engineering infrastructure. Later, she was named the associate director for technical activities at Waterloo's Centre for Pavement & Transportation Technology. In November 2005, Tighe and Carl Haas received an award to fund their investigation into Pavement Surveillance and Construction Site Modelling. Tighe was recognized as one of Canada's Top 40 Under 40 in 2006 and 2009. She also received the 2010 En-hui Yang Engineering Research Innovation Award for civil and environmental engineering.

As her career advanced, Tighe was named the Endowed Norman W. McLeod Chair in Sustainable Pavement Engineering in 2011. In this role, she helped develop the 2013 Transportation Association of Canada Pavement Asset Design and Management Guide. While developing the guide, she earned national recognition for her efforts in the field of civil engineering. Throughout 2014, she received numerous awards and honours for her achievements. She was first amongst the inaugural cohort of inductees to the College of New Scholars, Artists and Scientists of the Royal Society of Canada. She was also the recipient of the inaugural Bleeds Black Award for her "commitment to training and education of students and to the industry." Later, she earned the Academic Merit Award from the Transportation Association of Canada as someone who has made a "long-term contribution to the advancement of the academic field and to the development of tomorrow's transportation leaders." In November 2014, the Canadian Broadcasting Corporation recognized Tighe as being amongst Waterloo's top 10 influential alumni.

Beyond Canada, Tighe also helped establish a research connection with the University of Auckland. In 2016, she successfully encouraged Waterloo's Centre for Pavement and Transportation Technology to join the Climate Adaptation Research Platform, an initiative of the University of Auckland. At the same time, Tighe was honoured with the medal for Research and Development from the Ontario Professional Engineers. In 2017, Tighe served as President of the Canadian Society for Civil Engineering and was appointed Waterloo's Deputy Provost of Integrated Planning and Budgeting. Two years later, she was elected a Fellow of the Canadian Society of Civil Engineers.

=== McMaster ===
Tighe was appointed McMaster University’s ninth President and Vice-Chancellor on July 1, 2025. She had left Waterloo in 2020 to become the Provost and vice-president, Academic of McMaster University. In 2022, she received the Sandford Fleming Award from the Canadian Society for Civil Engineering for her "career achievements in civil engineering education and research, as well as a record of service and innovation."

== Personal life ==
Tighe married Christopher Raymond in 1997.

== See also ==
- List of University of Waterloo people
