= David Strangway =

Canadian geologist (1934–2016)

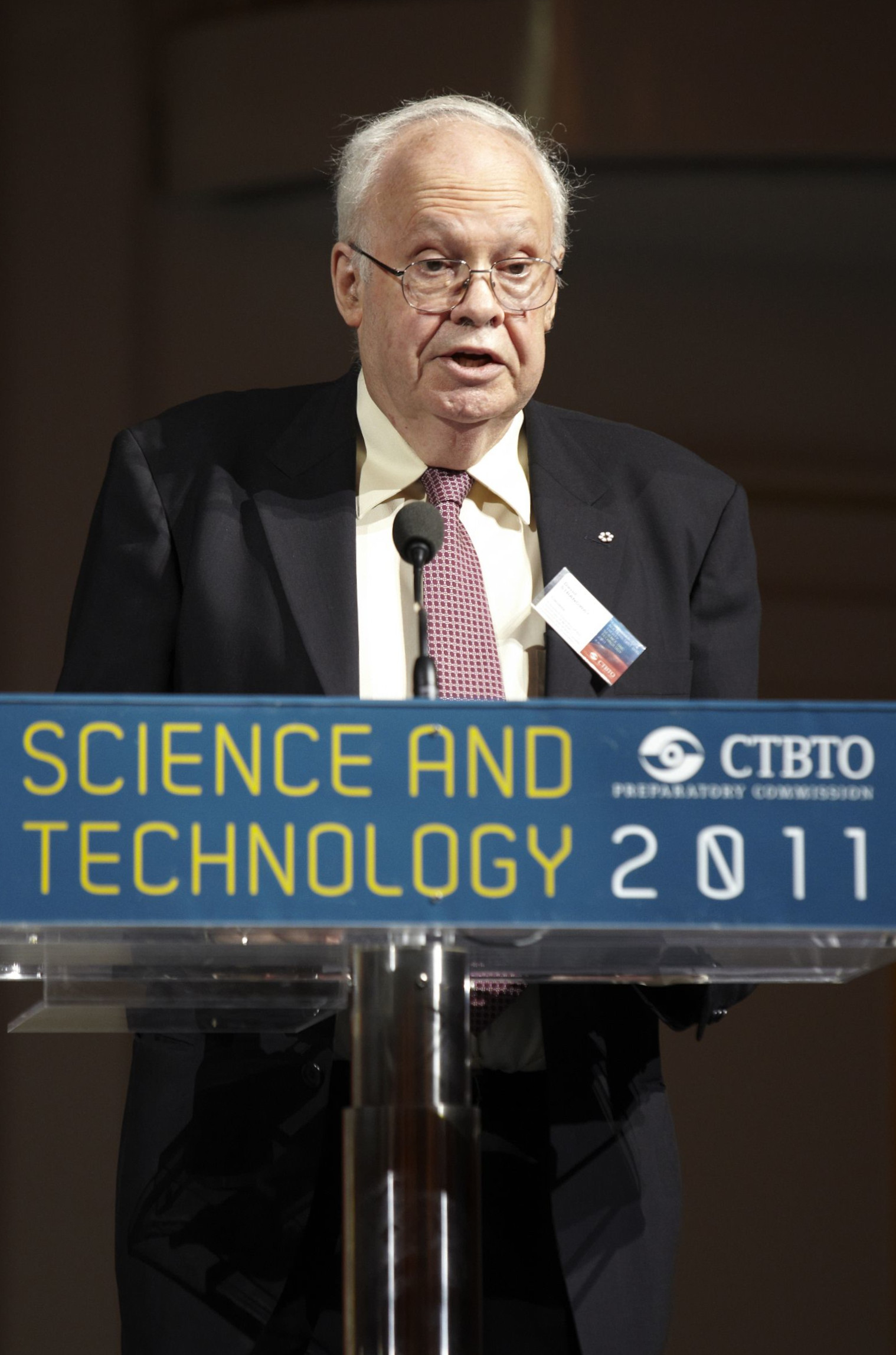
- Strangway at the Comprehensive Nuclear-Test-Ban Treaty Organization Science and Technology conference in 2011

1st President of Quest University Canada
- In office 2002 – 2007
- Preceded by: Position established
- Succeeded by: David J. Helfand

10th President and Vice-Chancellor of the University of British Columbia
- In office 1985–1997
- Preceded by: Robert H. T. Smith
- Succeeded by: Martha Piper

11th President of the University of Toronto
- In office 1983–1984
- Chancellor: George Ignatieff
- Preceded by: James Milton Ham
- Succeeded by: George Connell

5th Vice-President and Provost of the University of Toronto
- In office 1980 – 1983
- President: James Milton Ham
- Preceded by: Donald Chant
- Succeeded by: Frank Iacobucci

Personal details
- Born: David William Strangway; 7 June 1934 Simcoe, Ontario
- Died: 13 December 2016 (aged 82)
- Education: University of Toronto (BA, MA, PhD)
- Profession: Academic, College administrator

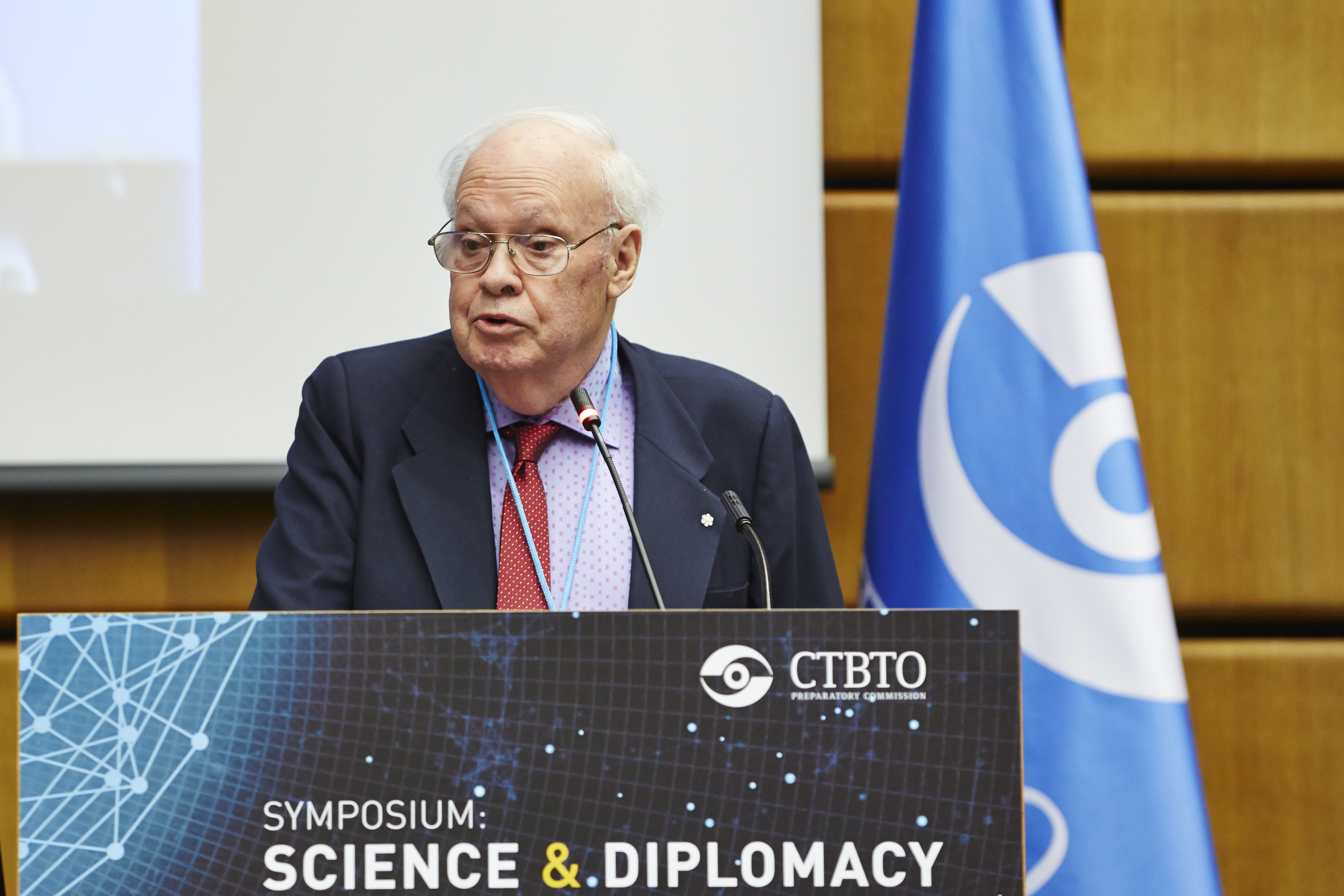
Strangway in January 2016

David William Strangway, OC FRSC (7 June 1934 – 13 December 2016) was a Canadian geophysicist and university administrator. Strangway was the founder, first President and first Chancellor of Quest University Canada, a private non-profit liberal arts and sciences university in Squamish, British Columbia which opened in September 2007. He was President Emeritus of the University of Toronto and the University of British Columbia.

== Early life and education ==
Strangway was born in 1934 in Simcoe, Ontario. He studied at the University of Toronto, earning a BA in Physics and Geology in 1956, an MA in physics and a PhD in physics in 1960.

== Career ==
Strangway began his teaching career as an Assistant Professor of Geology at the University of Colorado between 1961-64. In 1965, he joined M.I.T for three years as both an Assistant Professor of Geophysics and Researcher. In 1970, he joined NASA as the Chief of the Geophysics Branch and was responsible for the geophysical aspects of the Apollo missions. In 1972, he was awarded the NASA Exceptional Scientific Achievement Medal for his scientific contribution to NASA. As Chief of NASA's Geophysics Branch, David Strangway designed lunar experiments for Apollo astronauts and also was involved in the examination of returned Moon rocks that contributed to the further knowledge of the Solar System. Strangway is the author or co-author of more than 165 research papers, including results of lunar sample studies and experiments. Strangway's research focused extensively on magnetic studies and electromagnetic sounding, both terrestrially for exploration and mapping and in lunar mapping and exploration. Since 1971 he has served on a great number of scientific and academic committees on behalf of governmental or private sector organizations. In 1973 he served as the director of the Lunar Science Institute (later renamed the Lunar and Planetary Institute in 1977).

He was a vice-president and provost of the University of Toronto and the chairman of its Geology Department from 1973 to 1983. Upon the retirement of James Ham in 1983, Strangway was appointed the acting president of the University of Toronto. He was elevated to become the University's eleventh President after the designated successor, Donald Forster, suddenly died of a heart attack in August of that year.

From 1985 to 1997, he was the tenth President of the University of British Columbia. He provided the direction and impetus that enabled the large, publicly funded University of British Columbia to achieve world-class status during his 12 years as President. This was enhanced by leading what was at the time, Canada's largest fund-raising campaign and by creating UBC Real Estate Corp. to develop market housing.

From 1998 to 2004, Strangway was the President and Chief Executive Officer of the Canada Foundation for Innovation, an independent corporation created by the Government of Canada to fund research infrastructure. This autonomous, Ottawa-based organization was founded in 1997 to fund and revitalize national research infrastructure programs that would enable Canadian Universities, Colleges and Research Hospitals to carry out across-the-board scientific and technological projects of benefit to all Canadians. Of CFI's capital investment budget of $3.65 billion, more than $2.7 billion was invested during Strangway's six-year tenure – effectively stemming the loss of Canadian researchers to other countries. It was during this time that he played a key role in helping the Canadian government to create the Canada Research Chairs. This program, funded at the level of $300m a year, has created 2000 new positions in Canadian Universities. Strangway retired from CFI 31 March 2004 in order to devote his full attention to Quest University Canada during the important construction and start-up phases of its development.

In 1997, he was appointed by Canadian Prime Minister Jean Chretien to join with William Ruckelshaus, an appointee of the President of the U.S., to study the Pacific Salmon controversy between the two countries. Their work and recommendations formed the basis for negotiation of a new agreement.

== Death ==
He died on 13 December 2016.

== Membership of committees ==
- Premier's Advisory Council on Science and Technology
- International Institute os Sustainable Development Founding Board Member
- Chairman of the Ontario Geoscience Research Fund
- Chairman of the University Research Incentive Fund Ontario
- Member of the Lunar Science Research Plan
- Member of the Lunar Science and Analysis Planning Team (Awarded samples to investigators and prepared the summary of the results of the first Apollo mission)
- A member of COMPLEX, The National Academy of Science (Committee on Planetary Exploration)
- Chair of the Premier's Council on Environment and Economy
- Member of the American Geophysical Union Development Board
- One of the original members of the steering committee that created the Canada Research Chairs (Major impact on Canadian Universities' competitiveness)

== Honours ==
- In 1984, Strangway received the Logan Medal for his geological works. This award is the highest honour the Geological Association of Canada bestows.
- In 1987, he received the J. Tuzo Wilson Medal from the Canadian Geophysical Union
- In 1996, he was made an Officer of the Order of Canada for being an "internationally respected as an outstanding scientist and senior academic administrator".
- In 2009, he was given the Maurice Ewing Medal, the highest honor of the Society of Exploration Geophysicists.

== Notes ==
Academic offices
Preceded by Office created	President of Quest University; 2002 - 2007	Succeeded by Thomas Wood
Preceded by James Milton Ham	President of the University of Toronto; 1983–1984	Succeeded by George Connell
