= Patrick Deane (professor) =

Canadian academic administrator (born 1956)

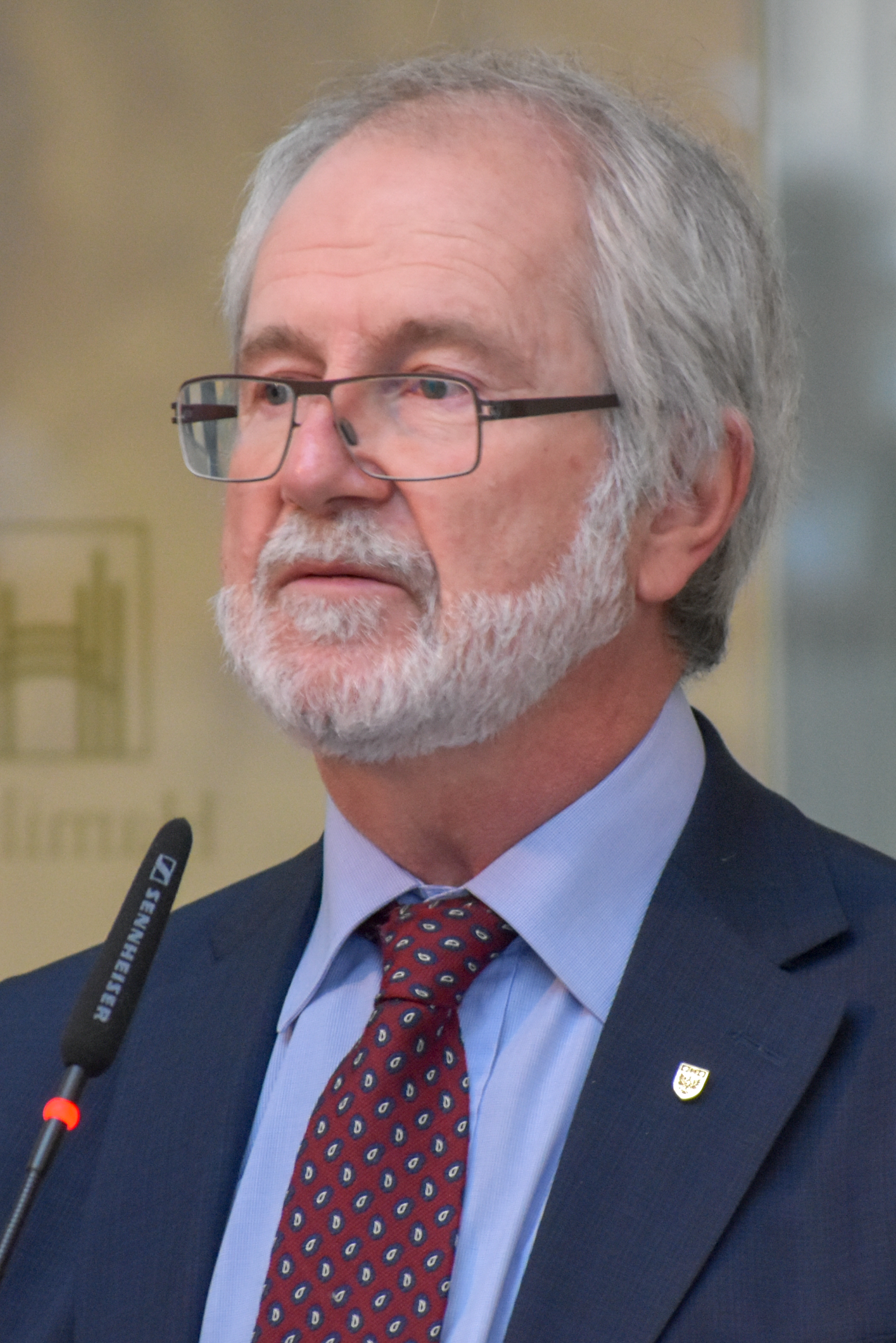
- Deane in 2018

21st Principal and Vice-Chancellor of Queen's University
- Incumbent
- Assumed office 1 July 2019
- Chancellor: Murray Sinclair; Shelagh Rogers
- Preceded by: Daniel Woolf

7th President and Vice-Chancellor of McMaster University
- In office 1 July 2010 – 30 June 2019
- Chancellor: Suzanne Labarge
- Preceded by: Peter George
- Succeeded by: David H. Farrar

President of the University of Winnipeg
- Acting
- In office 2002 – 2 May 2004
- Preceded by: Constance Rooke
- Succeeded by: Lloyd Axworthy

Personal details
- Born: 9 December 1956 (age 69) South Africa
- Education: University of the Witwatersrand (BA); University of Western Ontario (MA, PhD)

Academic background
- Thesis: Raising a Valid Sign: A Defence of the Form of David Jones’s "Anathemata" (1986)

Academic work
- Discipline: English literature
- Institutions: University of Toronto; University of Western Ontario; University of Winnipeg; Queen's University at Kingston; McMaster University

Patrick Deane (born 9 December 1956) is a Canadian scholar and university administrator, currently serving as the 21st principal of Queen's University. He was previously the acting president of the University of Winnipeg (2003–2004), the vice-principal (academic) at Queen's University (2005–2010) and the 7th president of McMaster University (2010–2019).

== Early life and education ==
Deane was born in 1956 in South Africa. His father, whose ancestors emigrated from Liverpool to South Africa in the 1820s, joined the British Royal Navy during World War II. After the war, Deane's mother met his father in Canada, when he went there on a business trip; they got married in 1947. When Deane was 15, his elder brother, who was 5 years his senior and was on conscription service, died of testicular cancer, after being misdiagnosed and denied treatment by a civilian doctor.

Deane went to King Edward VII School in Johannesburg, and then studied English and law at the University of the Witwatersrand, where he was a vocal and active opponent of apartheid. He graduated in 1978 and moved to Canada, to study English literature at the University of Western Ontario, obtaining a Master of Arts in 1980 and a PhD in 1985.

== Career ==
Deane's professional career began in 1986, when he was appointed an assistant professor at the University of Toronto, teaching English literature. He was invited back to the University of Western Ontario in 1988, when he was awarded the John Charles Polanyi Prize for Literature, becoming an assistant professor in the Department of English and teaching 21-century British literature, and was promoted to associate professor in 1994.; he was also Vice-Chair (1993-1995) and Chair (1997-2001) of the Department.

In 2001, Deane moved to the University of Winnipeg to take up the position of Vice-President (Academic), concurrently serving as a Professor of English. When the university's president, Constance Rooke, resigned in 2002, following a dispute with the board of regents over the university's finance, he became the Acting President and Vice-Chancellor in 2003. During this period, Deane oversaw the elimination of the university's accumulated debt, the first surplus budget in a decade, and the creation of the University of Winnipeg Foundation, a new fundraising arm for the university. Deane handed over the presidency to Lloyd Axworthy in 2004, returning to the role of Vice-President (Academic) and taking the newly established position of Provost. In 2005, Deane accepted the appointment of Vice-Principal (Academic) at Queen's University and serving as a Professor of English Language and Literature in parallel. He held these positions until 2010, when he assumed the role of President and Vice-Chancellor of McMaster University.

In November 2018, Queen's announced the return of Deane to succeed Daniel Woolf as the 21st Principal and Vice-Chancellor. Deane formally stepped down as McMaster's president on 30 June 2019, having served nearly 2 full terms in that capacity. He assumed the new role as the following day, on 1 July 2019.

== Personal life ==
Deane met his wife, Sheila, during his MA years at the University of Western Ontario, where she was undertaking her PhD in Women's Studies and was a Virginia Woolf scholar. They have a daughter, Petra, and a son, Colin, who, as of 2020, were respectively a genetics researcher in Vermont, US, and a teacher in Winnipeg School Division.

Deane and his family now live on a hobby farm called New Leaf Farm 20 km north of Kingston. They have been living on farms for 20 years, including during his tenure as McMaster President and Vice-Chancellor.

== Honors and awards ==
- John Charles Polanyi Prize for Literature (1988)
- Robin H. Farquhar Award for Excellence in Contributing to Self-Governance, University of Winnipeg (2004)
- 100th Convocation Award, University of Winnipeg (2013)

Academic offices
Preceded by Constance Rooke	President of University of Winnipeg (acting); 2003 - 6 June 2004	Succeeded by Lloyd Axworthy
Preceded by Peter George	7th President and Vice-Chancellor of McMaster University; 1 July 2010 - 30 June 2019	Succeeded by David H. Farrar
Preceded by Daniel Woolf	21st Principal of Queen's University; July 1, 2019–present	Incumbent
