= Walter Gage =

Canadian professor and administrator

Walter Henry Gage CC
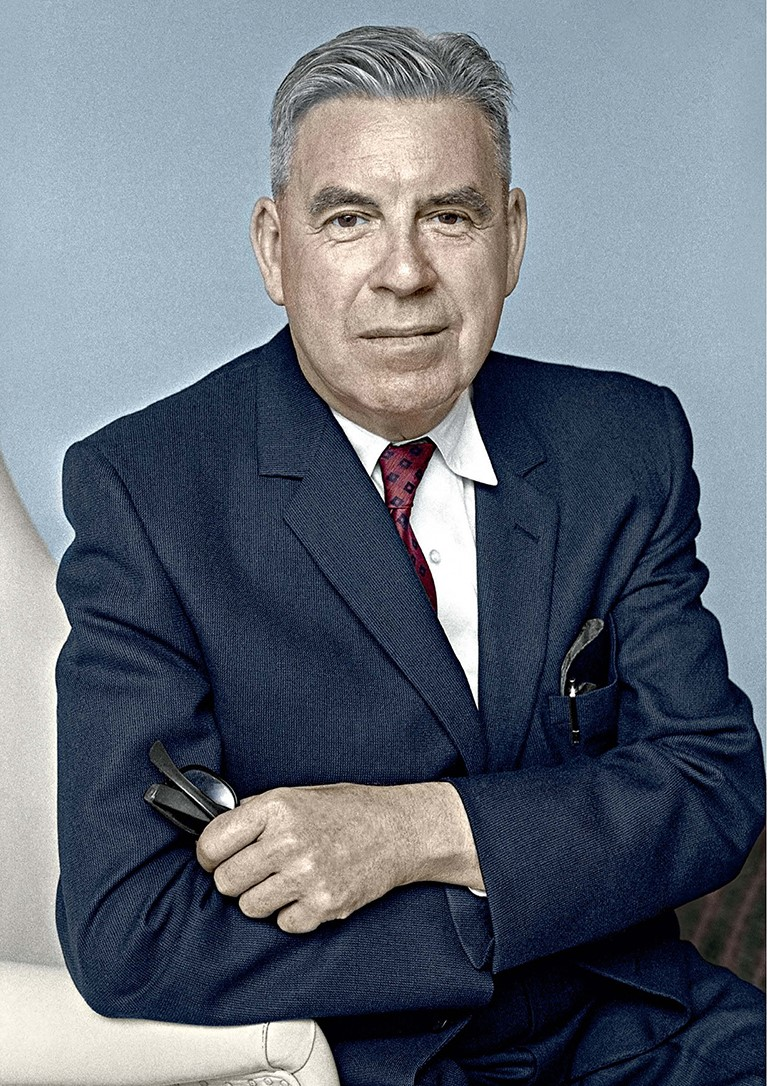
- Walter Henry Gage, 6th president of UBC

6th president of the University of British Columbia
- In office 1969–1975
- Preceded by: Kenneth Hare
- Succeeded by: Douglas T. Kenny

Personal details
- Born: March 5, 1905 Vancouver, British Columbia
- Died: October 3, 1978 (aged 73) Vancouver, British Columbia
- Education: University of British Columbia
- Awards: Companion of the Order of Canada, 1971

Walter Henry Gage CC (March 5, 1905 – October 3, 1978) was a Canadian professor and administrator who spent 50 years at the University of British Columbia, beginning as an undergraduate student and eventually becoming president of the university.

== Education ==
| 1911-18 | Tecumseh Elementary School (public) |
| 1918-21 | John Oliver Secondary School (public) |
| 1921-26 | University of British Columbia: B.A. (Hon. Math); M.A. (Math and Physics) |
| 1928-33 | Victoria College, Assistant Professor of Mathematics and Registrar |
| 1933-1978 | University of British Columbia, Department of Mathematics Assistant Professor 1933-36 Associate Professor 1937-43 Professor 1943-1978 |
| 1939-40 | California Institute of Technology, Teaching Fellowship |
| 1943-44 | Royal Canadian Air Force, Temporary Flight Lieutenant Canadian Army, Course Co-Director |
| 1948-1969 | University of British Columbia, Dean |
| 1958 | Honorary LL.D. (University of British Columbia) |
| 1969 | Inaugural Recipient, Master Teacher Award, University of British Columbia |
| 1969-1975 | President, University of British Columbia |
| 1974 | Honorary LL.D. (University of Victoria) |

== Biography ==
Walter Gage 1925 Annual [UBC 1.1/12219]

Walter Gage was born in the middle-class neighborhood of South Vancouver to parents Alexander and Ann, immigrants from Great Britain. They raised Walter and his older sister Elsie and influenced both siblings' interest in community and politics. Walter attended Tecumseh Elementary and John Oliver Secondary School in Vancouver, demonstrating an early interest in his studies. As a teenager, he taught Sunday school and coached basketball. In 1921, Gage was the first in his family to attend university when he enrolled in UBC. He earned a Bachelor of Arts with honors in mathematics in 1925, and a Master of Arts in mathematics in 1926.

1922 student demonstration to build the university [UBC 1.1/1315]

He taught mathematics at the University of British Columbia for over fifty years, from 1927 until his death in 1978. This period was interrupted only by his time teaching mathematics at Victoria College (1927–1933), where he also served as registrar (1929–1933).

While teaching mathematics, he served as dean of administrative and inter-faculty affairs and dean of inter-faculty and student affairs. In these roles, he worked to ensure that capable students would not be denied a university education because of personal adversities or financial hardship.

Walter Gage (in middle), temporary flight lieutenant RCAF 1943-1944, [UBC 85.1/14]

Walter Gage served as the 6th president of the University of British Columbia during a period of social change and growth (1969-1975). According to the university's 15th president, Gage's acceptance of the role was important to the university's ability to manage that period.

He continued to teach during and after his presidency. In 1969, he became the inaugural recipient of the university's annual Walter Koerner Master Teacher Award.

Gage is known for his efforts to ensure financial hardship did not prevent capable students from pursuing education. He supported students by establishing bursaries and personally contributing funds when necessary. He was known for his wit, for offering currency to struggling students, for his affection for the arts — especially theatre and music — and for his voluble manner of teaching.

Dean Walter Gage enjoying the appreciation of students, [UBC 41.1/2700-1

An excerpt from the citation for the honorary degree awarded to him by the University of British Columbia in 1958 described Walter Gage as "'the most and best beloved of the university family', referring to him as 'in a sense, the physical embodiment of this university's academic conscience, and a man whose scholarly attainments and standards of teaching are equaled only by his concern always to do justice to colleagues and students alike'". He was later awarded an honorary LL.D. by the University of Victoria, where he had taught.

In 1971, he was made a Companion of the Order of Canada, the highest rank in Canada's civilian honour system.

Following his death in 1978, the Walter Gage Residence for students at the University of British Columbia was named in his honor.

A book detailing the life and work of Walter Gage was published in 2018. The Age of Walter Gage: How One Canadian Shaped the Lives of Thousands discusses Gage's teaching methods and describes his large classes as being filled with keen students and enjoyment. It also covers his contributions to the UBC campus. The book chronicles Gage's life, and his influence on Canadians.

== See also ==
- List of presidents of the University of British Columbia
