= McMaster Museum of Art =

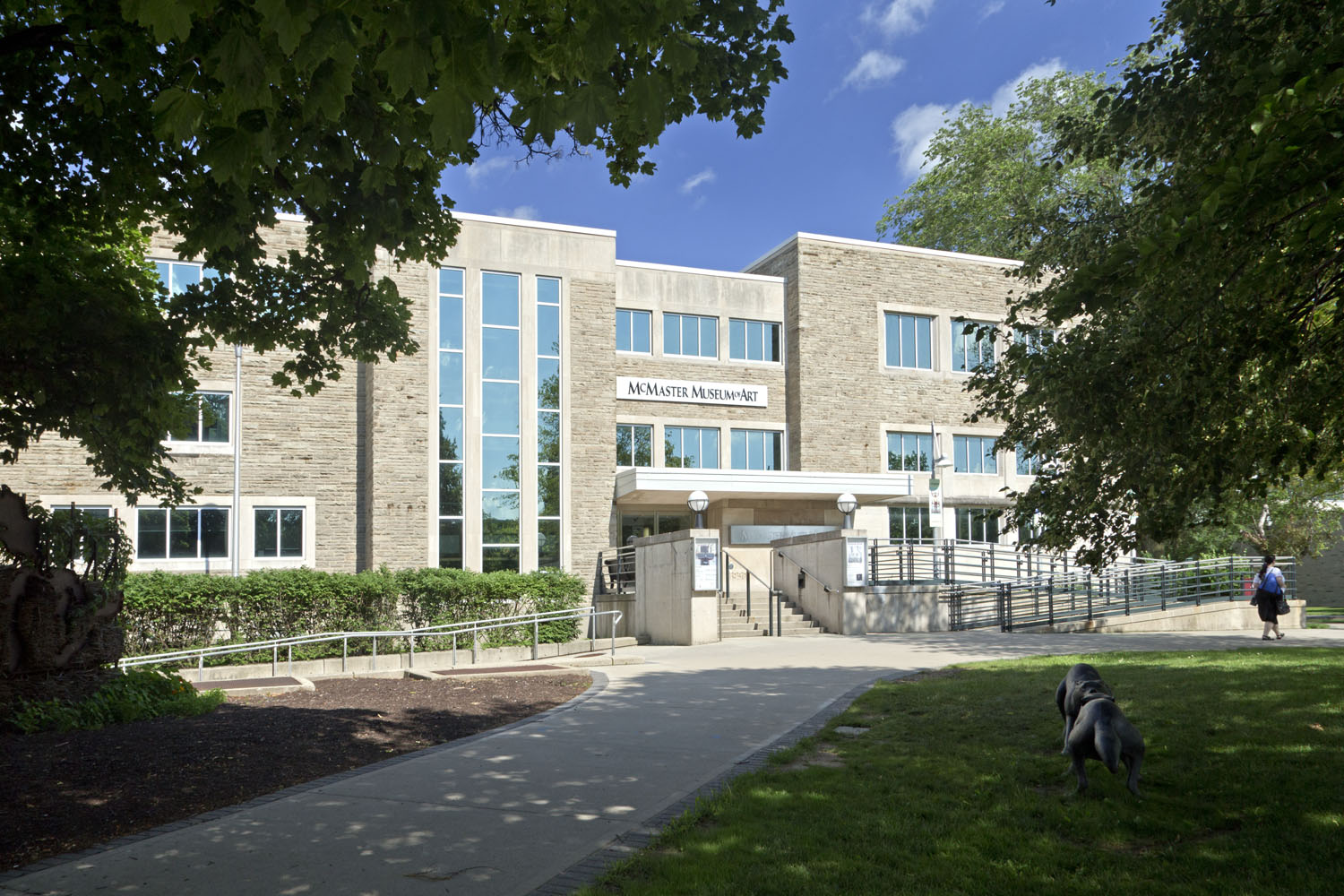
- Former name: McMaster Art Gallery (1967–1994)
- Established: 1967
- Location: McMaster University, Hamilton, Ontario
- Coordinates: 43.26266°N 79.91803°W
- Type: Art museum
- Visitors: 30,000 (2015–16)
- Director: Mary Reid
- Public transit access: Hamilton Street Railway: 1 King; 5 Delaware
- Website: museum.mcmaster.ca

The McMaster Museum of Art (MMA) is a non-profit public art gallery at McMaster University in Hamilton, Ontario. The museum is located in the centre of the campus, attached to Mills Memorial Library and close to the McMaster University Student Centre.

== History ==
McMaster University was founded in 1887, in Toronto, and the art collection began soon after as portraits of presidents and faculty accumulated. A donation of European prints by the Carnegie Institute in the 1930s led to more systematic collecting and programming. By the 1950s, regular art exhibitions were presented on campus in Mills Memorial Library.

In 1967, with the help of the chair of the History Department, Dr. Togo Salmon, the McMaster Art Gallery was given a purpose-built facility in the east wing of Togo Salmon Hall. The gallery moved across campus to its present larger location where it opened to the public under a new name, the McMaster Museum of Art, on June 11, 1994. Five years later the building was renamed the Alvin A. Lee Building in honour of President Emeritus Alvin A. Lee, an influential champion of the MMA, whose efforts helped make the current building possible.

== Programming ==
The MMA offers year-round exhibits consisting of historical, modern and contemporary art. In addition to hosting the McMaster University BFA graduating exhibition, the MMA also hosts a variety of public events including lunch and learn sessions, artist talks and workshops. The MMA's Education Gallery serves as a multipurpose room for lectures and study and is home to the museum's modest library made up of books, artist's files and exhibition catalogues.

The MMA belongs to the Ontario Association of Art Galleries reciprocal program, through which members of participating galleries receive free admission to all galleries.

== Collection ==
Many faculty members and the Wentworth House Art Committee, established to acquire contemporary Canadian and European art, guided the growth of the collection. Professors Karl Denner (German Department) and George Wallace (Art and Art History Department) are credited with the advancement of the German Expressionist art collection in the early 1960s.

The donation of over 200 European works in the 1980s by Hamilton jeweler Herman Levy O.B.E. put the museum on the map in the Canadian art scene. He later bequeathed $15.25 million to the museum with specific directions that the money must be spent within five years, on acquisition of art of non-North American origins. More recently, the Donald Murray Shepherd Trust provided funds for the purchase of contemporary European art from notable artists such as David Bomberg, Christian Rohlfs, and Natalia Goncharova.

The permanent collection, one of the finest University collections in the country, consists of over 7,000 objects. It includes:

- Impressionist and Post-Impressionist Art: The Herman H. Levy collection includes significant paintings by artists Gustave Courbet, Claude Monet, Camille Pissarro, Vincent van Gogh, and Gustave Caillebotte.
- Early 20th-century German Prints, including Ernst Barlach, Max Beckmann, Otto Dix, Ernst Ludwig Kirchner, and Käthe Kollwitz.
- European Old Master paintings and prints from the 16th century including Sir Thomas Lawrence, Willem Claeszoon Heda, Gerrit Dou and Michiel Sweerts.
- 20th-century European modernist and contemporary art from Ben Nicholson, Marcel Duchamp and Alexander Rodchenko to Joseph Beuys, Anselm Kiefer, Anish Kapoor, Antony Gormley and Gerhard Richter.
- Canadian art - a survey collection of historical works by Tom Thomson, A.Y. Jackson and other members of the Group of Seven. Contemporary works by established mid career and senior artists including Barbara Astman, Betty Goodwin, Shelagh Keeley, Arnaud Maggs, and Tony Scherman.
- Inuit art with emphasis on Cape Dorset prints and sculpture
- Antiquities

The museum's Paper Centre contains over 4,000 prints, drawings, and watercolours that the public can view by appointment.

The MMA is also home to the Bruce Brace Coin Collection, which consists of coins and medallions from Rome and Greece. The Collection has been the focus of numismatic inquiry aimed at improving what is known about daily life and trade in ancient Rome and Greece from as early as the fifth century BC to the fall of the Roman empire.

=== Selected works ===
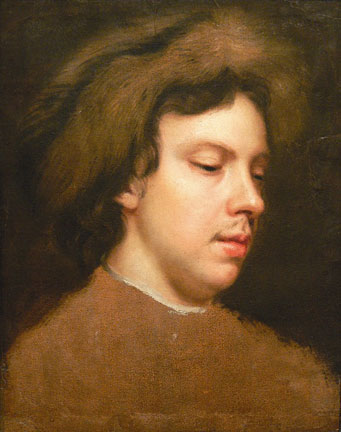
Mary Beale, Portrait of Charles Beale, c. 1660

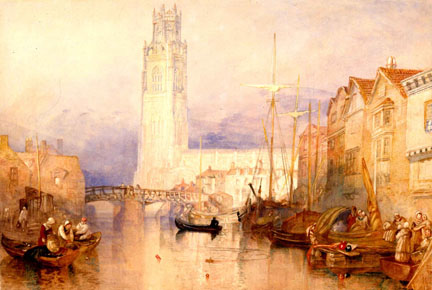
J. M. W. Turner, Boston in Lincolnshire, c. 1833

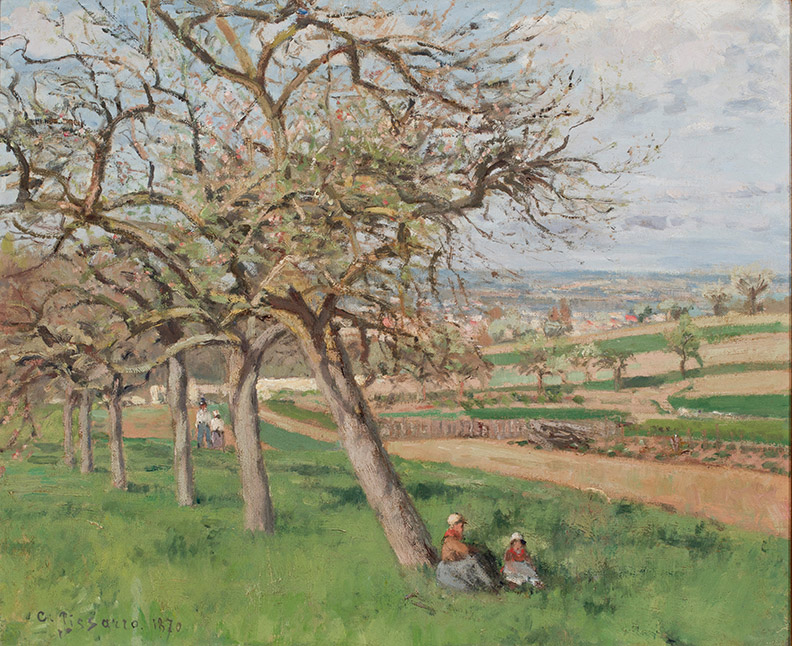
Camille Pissarro, Pommiers en fleurs, 1870

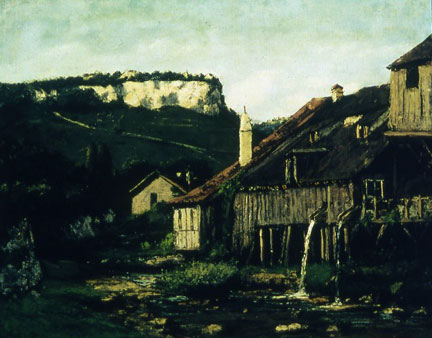
Gustave Courbet, Environs d'Ornans, 1874

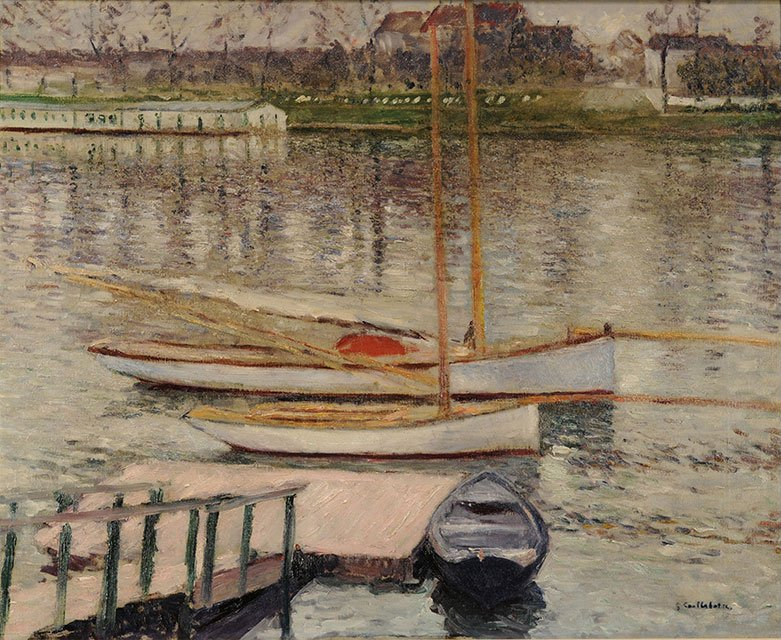
Gustave Caillebotte, Voiliers au Mouillage sur la Seine, à Argenteuil, 1883

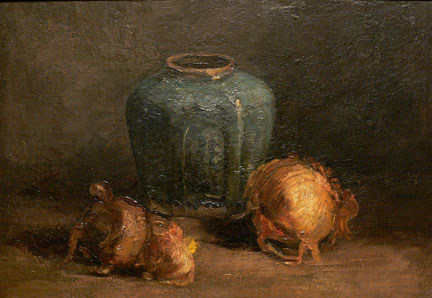
Vincent van Gogh, Still Life with Ginger Jar and Onions, 1885

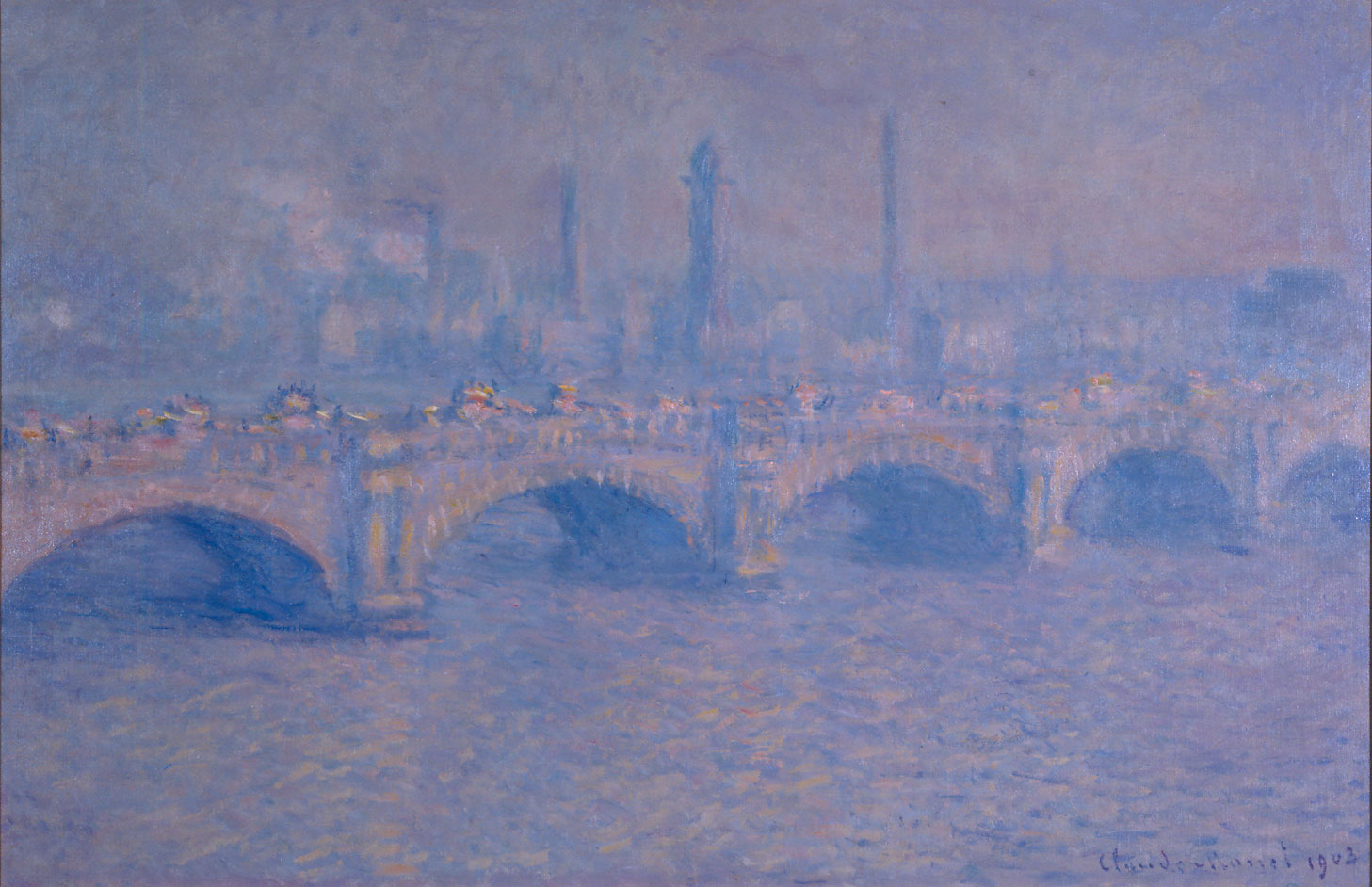
Claude Monet, Pont de Waterloo, effet de soleil, 1903

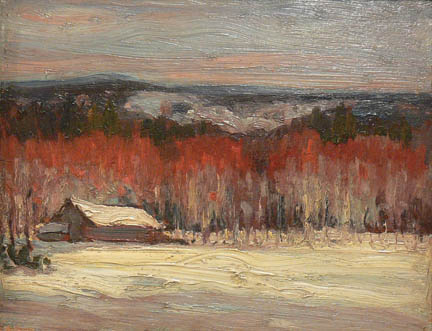
Tom Thomson, Algonquin Park, 1916

== Collaborative projects ==
McMaster Museum of Art works with faculties across the McMaster University campus. Notable projects/exhibitions using University research and experts include:

- Light Echo : Department of Physics and Astronomy
- Rising to the Occasion : English & Cultural Studies (John Douglas Taylor Conference)
- Togo Salmon Centenary Exhibition : Classics Department
- Synasthesia Exhibition : Psychiatry and Behavioural Neurosciences
- Fierce : Theatre and Film Studies
- Scrapes : Faculty of Humanities
- Allyson Mitchell: Ladies Sasquatch : Women's Studies
- First Contact? Exhibition Talk : Indigenous Studies
- Faculty Exhibition / Annual Graduating Student Exhibitions : McMaster School of the Arts
- A Glimpse of China in the 18th Century : Art History and The Confucious Institute
- The Art of Seeing – Visual Literacy Course with Department of Family Medicine : Faculty of Health Sciences
- Chewa Masks of Pain and Loss: AIDS in Malawi : Department of Anthropology

== See also ==
- List of art museums
- List of museums in Ontario
