= Georges Vanier Secondary School =

Georges Vanier Secondary School Woodbine Junior High School

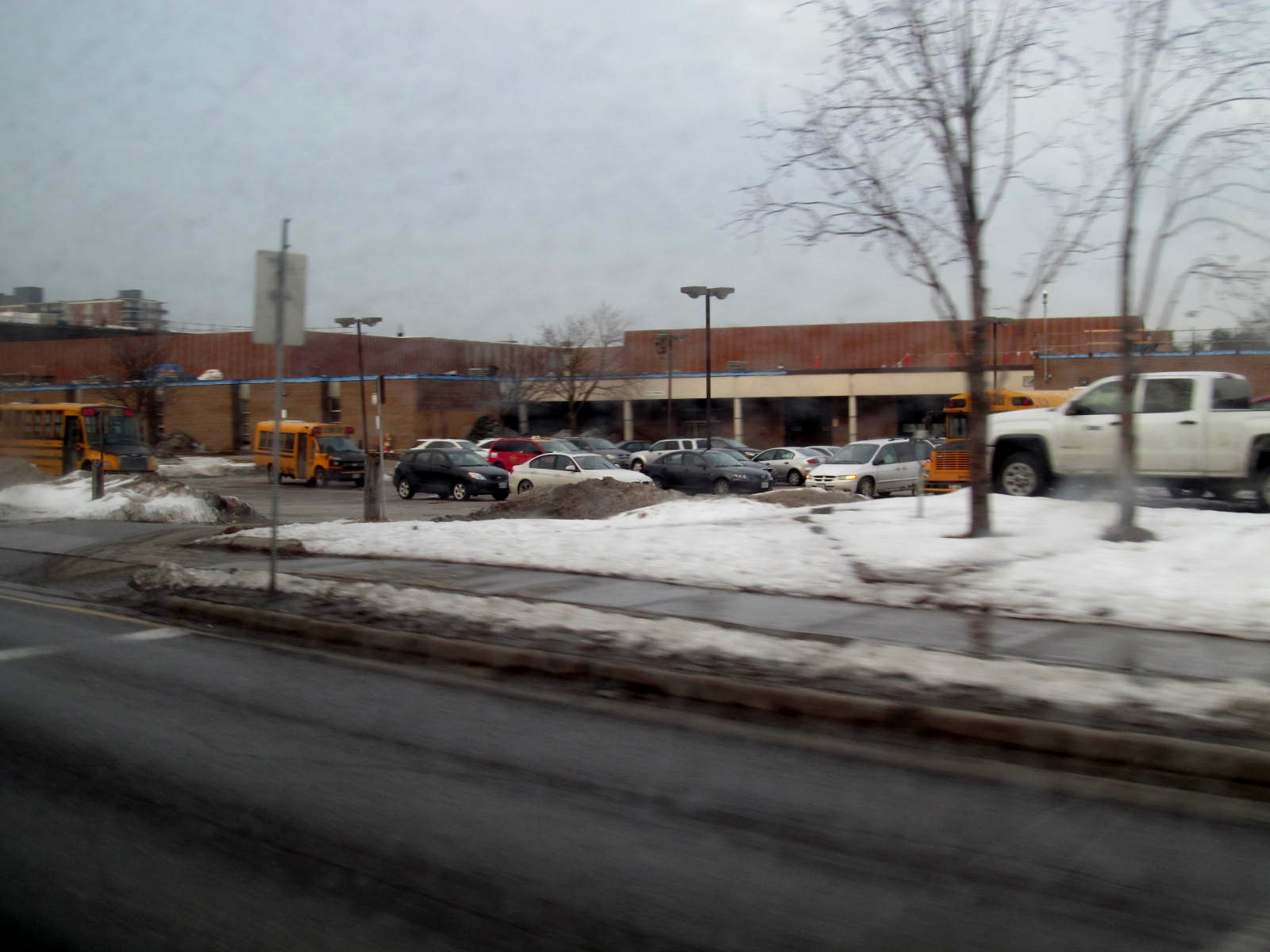

Location
- 3000 Don Mills Road; Toronto, Ontario, M2J 3B6; Canada; 43.783480°N 79.351115°W

Information
- School type: Public high school Public middle school
- Motto: Scholarship, Spirit, Social Responsibility! We believe it! We live it!
- Religious affiliation: none
- Founded: 1966
- School board: Toronto District School Board (North York Board of Education)
- Superintendent: Audley Salmon
- Area trustee: Ken Lister
- School number: 3345 / 1021118; 3446 / 921360
- Principal: Vanier: Karen Johnson; Woodbine: Michelle Fraser
- Grades: 9-12
- Enrolment: 726 (2017-18)
- Language: English
- Schedule type: Semestered
- Area: North York
- Colours: Maroon and Gold; Red and Green
- Team name: Vanier Vikings
- Website: schoolweb.tdsb.on.ca/georgesvanier/

Georges Vanier Secondary School and Woodbine Middle School are two public schools consisting of a junior high school (Grades 6 to 8) and high school (Grades 9 to 12) located in North York district of Toronto, Ontario. Owned and operated by the North York Board of Education (which is now merged into the Toronto District School Board), the school was named after Canada's first French-Canadian Governor General, Georges Vanier. Attached to the Vanier-Woodbine campus is the North-East Year Round Alternative Centre.

== History ==
Opened in 1966, Georges Vanier was selected by the Canadian Education Association as one of 21 exemplary schools across Canada. The school offers specialized programs such as MSC2, Stem +, Program 2 Art, "One World Youth Arts Project" program, BSc@Van, and the "Focus on Information Technology (FIT)" program, in addition to offering an Advanced Placement program and a Centennial College Partnership program. The school also provides 3 Specialist High Skills Majors (SHSM) programs: Advance, ICT, and Aviation & Aerospace. These programs give students the opportunity to earn nationally recognized certifications.

== Incidents ==
On the night of November 3, 2003 a fatal gang brawl left one individual dead after he succumbed to stab wounds. The individual was not a student at the school and later identified as a resident of Richmond Hill, Ontario who happened to be in the area at the time of the fight.

== Notable alumni ==
- David Bendeth, music producer, writer, mixing engineer and recording artist
- Ian Crichton, guitarist of the rock band Saga
- Benny Hinn, TV evangelist and faith healer
- Leighton Hope, Canadian sprinter and Olympian
- Maurice LaMarche, voice actor
- Geddy Lee, lead singer and bassist of the rock band Rush
- Alex Lifeson, guitarist of the rock band Rush
- Howie Mandel, comedian and Deal Or No Deal host (attended for half a year)
- Mark McKoy, Track & Field Olympian
- Kirk McLean, goaltender for the Vancouver Canucks
- Alannah Myles, recording artist and songwriter
- Garth Richardson, audio engineer, music producer
- Carl Rose Professional soccer player and 1976 Olympian
- Brian Saunders, Canadian sprinter and Olympian
- Gord Stellick, media personality and former manager of the Toronto Maple Leafs hockey club
- Catherine Swing, TV personality, actor, producer, director and former Miss Canada 1978
- Susan Tighe, civil engineer

== See also ==
- Education in Ontario
- List of secondary schools in Ontario
