= Alvin A. Lee =

Canadian academic (born 1930)

4th President and Vice-Chancellor of McMaster University
- In office 1980–1990
- Preceded by: Arthur Bourns
- Succeeded by: Geraldine A. Kenney-Wallace

Personal details
- Born: September 30, 1930 (age 95) Woodville, Ontario, Canada
- Education: University of Toronto (BA, MA, PhD)
- Occupation: Academic administration
- Profession: literary critic

Alvin A. Lee (born September 30, 1930), is a Canadian literary critic and former academic administrator.

== Early life and education ==
Lee was born in Woodville, Ontario. He attended the University of Toronto where he received his Bachelor of Arts, a Master of Arts and a PhD in English by 1961.

== Career ==
The majority of his academic career—some 39 years—was spent at McMaster University in Hamilton; Lee served as President and vice-chancellor of that university from 1980 to 1990. He also served as Chairman of the Council of Ontario Universities. The McMaster Museum of Art is housed in a building named in his honour because of his work acquiring extensive and valuable art collections for McMaster University. He received honorary doctorates from Victoria University in the University of Toronto, and from McMaster University, and was made an honorary professor at Beijing University, the University of Science and Technology Beijing, and Heilongjiang University. Lee holds B.A., M.A., M.Div., and Ph.D. degrees.

His academic interests lie in the fields of Old English literature, the Bible and literature, and literary theory.

Lee served as the General Editor of the 30-volume Collected Works of Northrop Frye, being published by the University of Toronto Press (the final volume published in 2012); he has edited two volumes himself, including an annotated edition of Frye's The Great Code. He also wrote the introduction to the Penguin Modern Classics editions of The Great Code and Words with Power. He is perhaps best known for his work on Beowulf: Gold-Hall and Earth-Dragon: Beowulf as Metaphor (University of Toronto Press). He has written articles, reviews and another book on Old English poetry, The Guest Hall of Eden: Four Essays on the Design of Old English Poetry (Yale University Press), and one on the Canadian poet and playwright, James Reaney. He, along with his wife, Hope Lee, also edited several textbooks for Harcourt Brace: Wish and Nightmare, Circle of Stories: One, Circle of Stories: Two, The Temple and the Ruin, The Garden and the Wilderness, and The Peaceable Kingdom.
