= Kenneth Hare =

Canadian climatologist (1919–2002)

- Born: February 5, 1919; Wiltshire
- Died: September 3, 2002; Oakville
- Education: Université de Montréal, King's College London
- Occupation: Meteorologist
- Employers: King's College London; McGill University; University of British Columbia; University of Toronto
- Awards: Companion of the Order of Canada; International Meteorological Organization Prize (1988); Massey Medal (1974); Patterson Medal (1973); Doctor of Law (honorary) (Queen's University at Kingston, Hon. LL.D.); Patron’s Medal (Mieczysław Klimaszewski, 137, Edmund Irving, 1977); Sir John William Dawson Medal (1987)

Frederick Kenneth Hare, CC OOnt FRSC (February 5, 1919 – September 3, 2002) was a Canadian climatologist and academic, who researched atmospheric carbon dioxide, climate change, drought, and arid zone climates and was a strong advocate for preserving the natural environment.

== Biography ==
He was born in Wiltshire, England, to parents Frederick Eli Hare and Irene Smith. He received a Bachelor of Science in 1939 from King's College London. During World War II, he was a meteorologist with the UK Air Ministry, and joined McGill University as an assistant professor after the war. In 1950, he received a PhD in Geography from the Université de Montréal.

=== Scientific career ===
Hare was Dean of Arts and Science at McGill starting 1962 before returning to England in 1964. He was Master of Birkbeck College from 1966 to 1968, during which he served as president of the Royal Meteorological Society.

In 1968, he accepted the position as fifth president of the University of British Columbia, which he served until he resigned on January 31, 1969. He joined the University of Toronto (U of T) becoming a professor of geography and physics in 1974. From 1974 to 1979 he was director of the Institute for Environmental Studies at the U of T. From 1979 until 1986 he was Provost of Trinity College. From 1988 to 1995 he was the sixth Chancellor of Trent University. From 1992 until his death in 2002, he chaired Canada's national Climate Program Planning Board.

== Research interests and advocacy ==
Hare's research interests included atmospheric carbon dioxide, climate change, drought, and arid zone climates. He was a strong advocate of protecting the natural environment and served on a wide variety of commissions and committees on subjects that included acid rain, desertification, heavy metals, nuclear reactors (and their waste products), ozone, greenhouse gases and climate change. He was on the Research and Development Advisory Panel of Atomic Energy of Canada and conducted studies on nuclear waste management in Sweden and France.

Hare considered that the most pressing environmental challenge facing Canada is climate change caused by excessive use of fossil fuels. He advocated effectively managed nuclear power as a viable alternative. Throughout his life Hare was a tireless public speaker and writer about these issues.

== Awards and honours ==
Hare received the Massey Medal in 1974. In 1978 he was made an Officer of the Order of Canada and was promoted to Companion in 1987.

In 1987, he was presented with the Sir John William Dawson Medal, for important contributions of knowledge in multiple domains, from the Royal Society of Canada in which he was a Fellow. The same year, he was awarded the Cullum Geographical Medal by the American Geographical Society.

In 1989, he received the Order of Ontario and the International Meteorological Organization Prize from the World Meteorological Organization. He was awarded honorary degrees by 11 universities.

Academic offices
Preceded by Horace Noel Fieldhouse	Dean of Arts and Science at McGill University; 1962–1964	Succeeded by Harry Woods Douglas
Preceded by John B. Macdonald	President of the University of British Columbia; 1968–1969	Succeeded by Walter Gage
Preceded by George Ignatieff	Provost of the University of Trinity College; 1979–1986	Succeeded by Robert H. Painter
Preceded by John Josiah Robinette	Chancellor of Trent University; 1988–1995	Succeeded by Mary Simon
