= Robert H. T. Smith =

President of the University of British Columbia (pro tempore)
- In office 1985
- Preceded by: George Pedersen
- Succeeded by: David Strangway

Personal details
- Born: May 22, 1935 (age 90) Walcha, New South Wales, Australia
- Occupation: geographer

Robert Henry Tufrey Smith AM (born May 22, 1935) is an Australian-Canadian academic who was the president pro tempore of the University of British Columbia in 1985. A professor of geography, Smith was educated at Australian National University, the University of New England and Northwestern University. In 1964, he was a Guggenheim Fellow. He is a fellow of the Academy of the Social Sciences in Australia and a member of the Order of Australia.
