= Arthur Bourns =

Canadian academic administrator (1919–2015)

3rd President and Vice-Chancellor of McMaster University
- In office 1972–1980
- Preceded by: Harry Thode
- Succeeded by: Alvin A. Lee

Personal details
- Born: Arthur Newcombe Bourns; December 8, 1919 Petitcodiac, New Brunswick, Canada
- Died: May 29, 2015 (aged 95) Burlington, Ontario, Canada
- Education: McGill University; Acadia University
- Occupation: Academic administration
- Profession: Professor, chemist

Arthur Newcombe Bourns, OC FRSC (December 8, 1919 – May 29, 2015) was a professor of chemistry and a university administrator with a long association with McMaster University in Hamilton, Ontario. He was professor emeritus and president emeritus of that institution. He was born in Petitcodiac, New Brunswick and was educated at Acadia University and McGill University, graduating in 1944 with a doctorate in Chemistry.

In 1947, he joined the department of chemistry at McMaster University as an assistant professor, after teaching at Acadia University and the University of Saskatchewan. He had begun his career as a research chemist in 1944 at the Dominion Rubber Company.

Bourns became a full professor at McMaster in 1953 and served as both a chairman and a dean before becoming vice-president of science and engineering in 1967. In 1972 he was appointed president of the university, a post he held until 1980. He had a distinguished academic career, becoming a Fellow of the Royal Society of Canada in 1964 and serving as a member of the National Research Council, 1969–1975. Bourns has received five honorary degrees and was made an officer of the Order of Canada in 1982. He married Marion Blakney and the couple had four children.
