= Takashi Ono (mathematician) =

Japanese-born American mathematician (1928–2026)

Takashi Ono (小野 孝, Ono Takashi; 18 December 1928 – 11 January 2026) was a Japanese-born American mathematician, specializing in number theory and algebraic groups.

== Early life and education ==
Ono was born in Nishinomiya, Japan, on 18 December 1928. He received his Ph.D. in 1958 at Nagoya University.

== Career ==
Ono immigrated to the United States after receiving an invitation from J. Robert Oppenheimer to work at the Institute for Advanced Study with a fellowship for the two academic years from 1959 to 1961 and then went to the University of British Columbia to work as an assistant professor of mathematics from 1961 to 1964. From 1964 to 1969 Ono was a tenured professor at the University of Pennsylvania. From 1969 to his retirement in 2011, he was a professor at Johns Hopkins University. In 1966 he was an invited speaker at the International Congress of Mathematicians in Moscow. In 2012 he was elected a Fellow of the American Mathematical Society.

== Personal life and death ==
Ono's youngest son, Ken Ono, is also a mathematician and professor at the University of Virginia as well as a former triathlete. His middle son, Santa J. Ono, served as the 15th President of the University of Michigan (previously the President and Vice-Chancellor of the University of British Columbia) and is a biomedical researcher. His eldest son, Momoro Ono, is a music professor at Creighton University. Ono died on 11 January 2026, at the age of 97.

== Selected publications ==
- 1959: Ono, Takashi (1959). "On some arithmetic properties of linear algebraic groups". Annals of Mathematics. 70 (2): 266–290. doi:10.2307/1970104. JSTOR 1970104.
- 1961: Ono, Takashi (1961). "Arithmetic of algebraic tori". Annals of Mathematics. 74 (1): 101–139. doi:10.2307/1970307. JSTOR 1970307.
- 1963: Ono, Takashi (1963). "On the Tamagawa number of algebraic tori". Annals of Mathematics. 7 8 (1): 47–73. doi:10.2307/1970502. JSTOR 1970502.
- 1964: Ono, Takashi (1964). "On the relative theory of Tamagawa numbers". Bulletin of the American Mathematical Society. 70 (2): 325–326. doi:10.1090/s0002-9904-1964-11140-x. MR 0156856.
- 1965: Ono, Takashi (1965). "On the relative theory of Tamagawa numbers". Annals of Mathematics. 82 (1): 88–111. doi:10.2307/1970563. JSTOR 1970563.
- 1965: Ono, Takashi (1965). "The Gauss-Bonnet theorem and the Tamagawa number". Bulletin of the American Mathematical Society. 71 (2): 345–348. doi:10.1090/s0002-9904-1965-11290-3. MR 0176986.
- 1969: Ono, Takashi (1969). "On Gaussian sums". Bulletin of the American Mathematical Society. 75 (7): 43–45. doi:10.1090/s0002-9904-1969-12139-7. MR 0245547. PMC 220918. PMID 16590967.
- 1969: Ono, Takashi (1966). "On algebraic groups and discontinuous groups". Nagoya Mathematical Journal. 27 (Pt 1): 279–322. doi:10.1017/S002776300001206X. MR 0199193. Zbl 0166.29802.
- 1990: An Introduction to Algebraic Number Theory. Plenum Publishers., Ono, Takashi (6 December 2012). 2nd edition. Springer. ISBN 9781461305736.
- 1994: Variations on a Theme of Euler: Quadratic Forms, Elliptic Curves and Hopf Maps. Plenum. 1994. ISBN 9780306447891.
- 2008: Gauss sums and Poincaré sums (in Japanese). Nippon Hyoron Sha.
