= George Pedersen (academic administrator) =

Canadian academic administrator (born 1931)

8th President and Vice-Chancellor of the University of Western Ontario
- In office 1985 – July 1, 1994
- Preceded by: Alan K. Adlington (acting)
- Succeeded by: Paul Davenport

President of the University of British Columbia
- In office 1983–1985
- Preceded by: Douglas T. Kenny
- Succeeded by: Robert H. T. Smith

President of Simon Fraser University
- In office January 1, 1979 – March 31, 1983
- Preceded by: Daniel R. Birch (acting)
- Succeeded by: George Ivany (acting)

Personal details
- Born: Knud George Pedersen; June 13, 1931 (age 95) Three Creeks, Alberta
- Occupation: academic administrator

Knud George Pedersen, OC OOnt OBC (born June 13, 1931) is a Canadian academic administrator. He was the president of Simon Fraser University (1979 to 1983), University of British Columbia (1983 to 1985), University of Western Ontario (1985 to 1994), interim president of the University of Northern British Columbia, and founding president of Royal Roads University (1995-1996). He served as chancellor of the University of Northern British Columbia from 1998 until 1999.

== Biography ==
Born in Three Creeks, Alberta, Pedersen received his B.A. from the University of British Columbia, an M.A. from the University of Washington, and his Ph.D. in Education from the University of Chicago in 1968.

In 1992, he was made an Officer of the Order of Canada for being "devoted to the cause of higher education." In 1994, he was awarded the Order of Ontario. In 2002, he was awarded the Order of British Columbia.

In 2005, he was appointed Chair of the Board of Governors of Emily Carr Institute.
