= Geraldine A. Kenney-Wallace =

British-Canadian academic (1943–2023)

5th President and Vice-Chancellor of McMaster University
- In office 1990–1995
- Preceded by: Alvin A. Lee
- Succeeded by: Peter George

Personal details
- Born: 29 March 1943 London, England
- Died: 17 October 2023 (aged 80) Monaco
- Spouse: Stephen Charles Wallace (m.1970–2015; his death)
- Occupation: Academic administration
- Profession: Professor, scientist

Geraldine Anne Kenney-Wallace (29 March 1943 – 17 October 2023) was a British-Canadian academic. She served as the president and vice-chancellor of McMaster University from 1990 to 1995. She was educated in England and later earned her Ph.D. from the University of British Columbia. Kenney-Wallace was responsible for organizing the first ultrafast laser lab in Canada, in 1974, at the University of Toronto. She was a professor of chemistry and physics at the University of Toronto and had served as Chairman of the Science Council of Canada. She was a recipient of a E.W.R. Steacie Memorial Fellowship (1984), Guggenheim Fellowship (1983), and Killam Senior Research Fellowship (1979). Kenney-Wallace died on 17 October 2023, at the age of 80.
