= Stephen Toope =

Canadian legal scholar (born 1958)

Stephen Toope OC FRSC
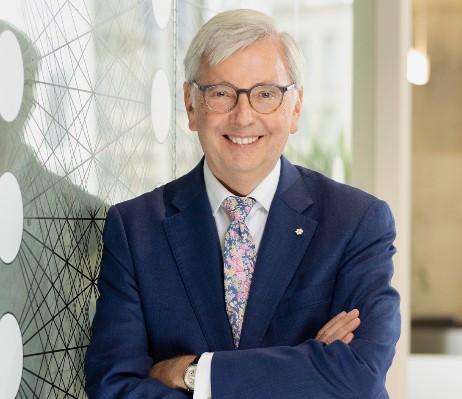
- Toope in 2022

President and CEO, Canadian Institute for Advanced Research (CIFAR)
- Incumbent
- Assumed office November 1, 2022
- Preceded by: Alan Bernstein

Vice-Chancellor of the University of Cambridge
- In office October 1, 2017 – September 30, 2022
- Preceded by: Sir Leszek Borysiewicz
- Succeeded by: Anthony Freeling (acting)

2nd Director of the Munk School of Global Affairs and Public Policy
- In office June 1, 2015 – October 1, 2017
- Preceded by: Janice Stein
- Succeeded by: Randall Hansen (interim)

12th President of the University of British Columbia
- In office July 1, 2006 – June 30, 2014
- Preceded by: Martha Piper
- Succeeded by: Arvind Gupta

Personal details
- Born: Stephen John Toope; February 14, 1958 (age 68) Montreal, Quebec, Canada
- Spouse: Paula Rosen
- Children: 3
- Education: Harvard University (BA); McGill University (LLB, BCL); Trinity College, Cambridge (PhD)
- Occupation: Academic administrator
- Profession: Academic, lawyer, legal scholar, pedagogue

Stephen John Toope OC FRSC (born February 14, 1958) is a Canadian legal scholar, academic administrator and a scholar specializing in human rights, public international law and international relations. In November 2022, he was appointed as the fifth president and CEO of the Canadian Institute for Advanced Research (CIFAR). Prior to this, he served for five years as the 346th Vice-Chancellor of the University of Cambridge.

== Education ==
Toope graduated from Harvard College in 1979 with a bachelor's degree in English Literature and European History. He then received two law degrees – in common law and civil law – from the McGill University Faculty of Law in 1983, where he served as editor-in-chief of the McGill Law Journal. In 1987, he was awarded a Doctorate of Philosophy in arbitration law at Trinity College, Cambridge.

== Career ==
After completing his PhD, Toope joined McGill University's faculty. He served as dean of McGill University Faculty of Law from 1994 to 1999. During his tenure as dean, he led the then-largest capital campaign in Canadian law faculty history to build a new Law library, and oversaw the renewal of the faculty's curriculum.

Toope then headed the Trudeau Foundation, named in honor of Canadian Prime Minister Pierre Elliott Trudeau.

In 2006, Toope became the 12th president and vice-chancellor of the University of British Columbia succeeding Martha Piper. He also held an academic position at the university as a tenured professor of law. He assumed the presidential post on July 1, 2006, and held the position for eight years, until June 30, 2014. On April 3, 2013, it was announced that Toope would leave the UBC presidency effective June 2014 to "pursue academic and professional interests in international law and international relations".

In January 2015, Toope became the director of the University of Toronto's Munk School of Global Affairs.

He was named Officer of the Order of Canada in 2015.

On October 1, 2017, he became the 346th person to serve as Vice-Chancellor at Cambridge University in England, becoming the first non-Briton to do so. He is concurrently professor of international law at the Faculty of Law, a Professorial Fellow of Clare Hall, and an Honorary Fellow of Trinity College.

Toope holds a number of honorary doctorates, including from the University of Alberta, the University of British Columbia, McGill University and the University of Bristol. In 2019, he received an honorary LLD from the Law Society of Ontario. The same year, he was elected Fellow of the Royal Society of Canada.

His service to the community includes serving on the boards of organizations that promote human rights and international development, including the Canadian Human Rights Foundation, the World University Service of Canada, the United Nations Working Group on Enforced or Involuntary Disappearances and Canada's International Development Research Centre (IDRC).

In a 2018 op-ed he criticized British politicians for "condemning UK universities as broken and in need of market discipline."

During his annual university address, in 2020 he announced Cambridge was removing fossil fuel investments from its portfolio.

On September 20, 2021, Toope announced he would be stepping down as vice-chancellor of the University of Cambridge, two years short of completing his seven-year term. His last day in the role was September 30, 2022.

In May 2022, he was selected as the 5th President of Canadian Institute for Advanced Research (CIFAR), commencing November 1, 2022.

== Personal ==
Toope took up residence in Cambridge in 2018, along with his wife, Paula Rosen, a speech-language pathologist and musical theatre composer. They have three adult children.

Academic offices
Preceded by Martha Piper	President of the University of British Columbia; 2006–2014	Succeeded by Arvind Gupta
Preceded by Sir Leszek Borysiewicz	Vice-Chancellor of the University of Cambridge; 2017–2022	Succeeded by Anthony Freeling (acting)
