= Yaprak Baltacioğlu =

Canadian public servant, lawyer and professor

Yaprak Baltacioğlu CM

Secretary of the Treasury Board
- In office November 12, 2012 – April 3, 2018
- Prime Minister: Stephen Harper; Justin Trudeau
- Preceded by: Marc O'Sullivan
- Succeeded by: Peter Wallace

Deputy Minister of Transport, Infrastructure, and Communities
- In office July 2009 – October 2012
- Minister: John Baird; Chuck Strahl; Denis Lebel

Deputy Minister of Agriculture and Agri-food
- In office March 4, 2007 – June 2009
- Minister: Chuck Strahl; Gerry Ritz

Personal details
- Born: 1959 (age 66–67) Ankara, Turkey
- Citizenship: Canadian
- Spouse: Robert Fonberg
- Education: Istanbul University (LLB), Carleton University (MPA)

Yaprak Baltacioğlu CM (born 1959) is a retired Canadian public servant, lawyer, and professor of Turkish descent. She has held senior leadership positions in the Canadian public service, serving as Secretary of the Treasury Board from 2012 to 2018. Baltacioğlu retired from the public service in 2018, and was appointed as the twelfth Chancellor of Carleton University in 2018. She is also on the faculty at the School of Public Policy and Governance at the University of Toronto where she teaches graduate courses.

== Life and career ==
Baltacioğlu was born and raised in Ankara, Turkey. She obtained a law degree at Istanbul University before immigrating to Canada in 1980 at the age of 21. After settling in Canada, Baltacioğlu pursued a master's in public administration at Carleton University, which introduced her to a career in the federal public service, beginning as a term employee at the Public Service Commission shortly after earning her graduate degree in 1989.

Baltacioğlu eventually rose to prominent leadership positions across government and was appointed as Agriculture and Agri-Food Canada's first female Deputy Minister in 2007. She later served as Deputy Minister for Transport, Infrastructure, and Communities from 2007 to 2012 before being appointed Secretary of the Treasury Board, a role which she would fulfill until 2018.

Baltacioğlu was made a member of the Order of Canada in 2021.
