= John B. Macdonald =

John Barfoot Macdonald (February 23, 1918 – December 24, 2014) was a Canadian academic.

== Biography ==
Macdonald was born on February 23, 1918, in Toronto, Ontario, Canada. In 1942, he graduated in Dental Surgery from the University of Toronto. During the Second World War, he served in the Dental Corps. He received an M.S. in bacteriology from the University of Illinois in 1948 and a PhD from Columbia University in 1953. In 1949, he started teaching at the University of Toronto, then at Harvard University from 1956, up until 1962, when he became President of the University of British Columbia until 1967.

His 1962 report, Higher Education in British Columbia and a Plan for the Future, led to the establishment of Simon Fraser University and the University of Victoria. He also paved the way for the establishment of the National Sciences and Engineering Council, the Humanities and Social Sciences Council and the Medical Research Council. In the 1970s, he served as CEO of the Council of Ontario Universities.

He received honorary degrees from Harvard University, the University of Manitoba, Simon Fraser University, the University of British Columbia, Wilfrid Laurier University, Brock University, the University of Western Ontario, the University of Windsor and the University of Toronto. He was also named to the Order of Canada.

Macdonald died on December 23, 2014.

== Bibliography ==
- Chances and Choices: A Memoir (2001)
