= Arvind Gupta (computer scientist) =

Indo-Canadian computer scientist

13th President of the University of British Columbia
- In office 2014–2015
- Preceded by: Stephen Toope
- Succeeded by: Martha Piper (interim)

Personal details
- Born: c. 1961 Jalandhar, Punjab, India
- Spouse: Michelle Pereira
- Children: 3 daughters: Leandra Gupta
- Occupation: Administrator
- Profession: Academic, Mathematics, Computer Scientist

Arvind Gupta
- Education: McMaster University, University of Toronto
- Scientific career
- Thesis: Constructivity Issues in Tree Minors (1990)
- Doctoral advisor: Stephen Cook, Alasdair Urquhart

Arvind Gupta (born c. 1961) is an Indo-Canadian computer scientist, was the 13th President of the University of British Columbia (UBC) and former CEO of Mitacs Canada.

== Early life and education ==
Gupta was born in Jalandhar in the Indian state of Punjab. Both his parents were academics. His mother was one of the first women to teach mathematics at a college in the Indian state of Uttar Pradesh.

Gupta lived in India and spoke Punjabi for his first five years until his family moved to Detroit where his father, a chemistry professor, had started a fellowship at Wayne State University. He then learned to speak English. Within two years, they moved to Timmins, Ontario after his father earned a job as a pollution chemist with a mining company.

He obtained a bachelor's degree in mathematics at McMaster University in Hamilton, Ontario before earning a master's and a PhD at the University of Toronto, under the supervision of Stephen Cook and Alasdair Urquhart. His family knew some of the victims killed in the 1985 bombing of Air India Flight 182.

== Academia ==
Gupta spent 18 years in the School of Computing Science at Simon Fraser University before being recruited by UBC in 2009 as a professor of computer science. In 2012, he joined the federal government's Science, Technology and Innovation Council.

From 2000 until his appointment as President of UBC in 2014, Gupta served as CEO and scientific director of Mitacs Canada, a national non-profit that worked with government and industry to fund student researchers.

Gupta resigned abruptly from his position as President of UBC on August 7, 2015, after 13 months of service. The reasons for his resignation were not revealed and caused some public controversies.

In October 2015, the University of Toronto announced Gupta's joining them as a distinguished visiting professor for one academic year.

Academic offices
Preceded by Stephen Toope	President of the University of British Columbia; 2014–2015	Succeeded by Martha Piper (interim)
