= Colleen Dell =

Canadian public sociologist

Colleen Anne Dell
- Occupations: Public sociologist, animal-assisted intervention practitioner, and academic
- Awards: Women of Distinction Award, Research, Science and Technology category, YWCA; Order of the Hospital of St. John of Jerusalem

Academic background
- Education: B.A., Sociology; M.A., Sociology; Ph.D., Sociology
- Alma mater: University of Winnipeg; University of Manitoba; Carleton University
- Website: https://colleendell.com

Colleen Anne Dell is a Canadian public sociologist, animal-assisted intervention practitioner, and academic. She is a professor and Centennial Enhancement Chair in One Health & Wellness in the Department of Sociology and associate in the School of Public Health at the University of Saskatchewan. She is most known for her research on criminal justice, mental health, substance abuse, and Indigenous peoples’ health.

Dell’s current program of research applies a community-based and patient-oriented participatory approach with both humans and animals. Dell's research focuses on how helpful the human-animal bond can be to promote wellness among individuals, communities, and animals. She pays particular attention to the One Health concept of "zooeyia"—how interaction with companion animals can benefit the health of people. Her team’s research in the field has received media recognition, and has been featured by CNN, People Magazine, Canadian Press, NPR, Medscape, and The New York Times.

Since 2019, she has been associated with the Strategic Development Group for Multispecies Dementia International Research Network.

== Education ==
Dell graduated with a bachelor's degree in sociology from the University of Winnipeg in 1992. She then enrolled at the University of Manitoba, and received her master's degree in sociology in 1996. She earned her doctoral degree in the Department of Sociology at Carleton University in 2001.

== Career ==
Dell began her academic career in 1998, as a sessional lecturer in the Department of Sociology and Anthropology at Carleton University. In 2001, she was briefly appointed as a lecturer in the Department of Sociology and Anthropology, before becoming an assistant professor in the Department of Sociology and Anthropology at Carleton University. She was promoted to associate professor in the Department of Sociology and Anthropology in 2006, and became an adjunct professor in 2007. These positions were held jointly with the Canadian Centre on Substance Use and Addiction (formerly Canadian Centre on Substance Abuse), where she is serving as senior research associate and has been in various other roles since 2001. Her tenure at the University of Saskatchewan started in 2007, with her appointment as the research chair in substance abuse. She served there as associate professor of sociology till 2012. Along with this appointment, she also held a joint appointment in the School of Public Health till 2015. From 2016 until 2021, she was appointed as the Centennial Enhancement Chair in One Health & Wellness. Currently, she has been serving as an associate faculty member in the School of Public Health, and as professor of sociology at University of Saskatchewan. In 2021, she was reappointed as the Centennial Enhancement Chair in One Health & Wellness.

== Works ==
Dell’s research is primarily focused on the human-animal bond and "zooeyia", with particular attention to exploring the impact of therapy dogs visiting in various settings, such as prisons and hospitals. She has published over 85 articles, 25 book chapters, and 57 reports on topics related to animal-assisted interventions, addictions, criminalization, health, healing and wellness, mental health, Indigenous wellbeing, and knowledge mobilization.

In 2022, NPR News featured Dell’s work on the integration of therapy dogs as a way to echo Indigenous holistic approaches to health. Other research by Dell and her team suggests that culture-based interventions integrated into addictions treatment for Indigenous people can help improve client functioning in all areas of wellness. Alongside the Thunderbird Partnership Foundation, in 2015 Dell co-led the development of the Native Wellness Assessment, a measurement tool to demonstrate the efficacy of cultural interventions from a foundation of Indigenous evidence.

In a 2008 study, Dell and her team determined the association between the beliefs of a group of adult, male prisoners in Iran about the transmission of HIV and their high-risk practices while in prison. The team found that educational harm reduction initiatives that are intended to promote the effectiveness of strategies designed to reduce the risk of HIV transmission may also decrease prisoners' high-risk behaviors. In 2010 she wrote about harm reduction policies for Indigenous peoples in Canada, and integrated these understandings into the therapy dog field with Indigenous opioid agonist therapy program patients. She co-published this work with program staff, a patient, and a therapy dog. She also led a study in understanding the role of service dogs in the health of veterans diagnosed with PTSD and substance use disorder.

Dell's study on the stigma faced by Indigenous women with substance use health concerns was translated into a workshop and accompanying song and video, titled From Stilettos to Moccasins. More recently, the findings of her team’s therapy dog emergency department controlled trial were translated into an animated plain language short video. As co-founder and facilitator with Darlene Chalmers of the PAWSitive Support prison program, they have undertaken evaluations of the impact of therapy dogs in federal correctional institutions and shared them in an Animal Memories magazine. This and other gathered knowledge has been developed into an online therapy dog handler education course, released in 2022. Her team’s study with service dogs have also been translated into an online education course for trainers, released 2022.

In 2011 Dell co-edited a Special Edition Substance Use & Misuse journal on volatile substance misuse.

== Selected awards and honors ==
- 1995 - Winnipeg City Community Service Award, Maples Youth Services Canada Project
- 2007 - European Union Visitor’s Program Award, Delegation of the European Commission to Canada
- 2010 - Profile, Herstory: The Canadian Women's Calendar
- 2010 - Women of Distinction Award, Research, Science and Technology category, YWCA
- 2010 - Top 10 Research Success Story, 10th Anniversary Special Issue of Intersections, Canadian Institutes of Health Research, Institute of Gender and Health
- 2017 - Appointment as Member (Investiture Recipient) to The Most Venerable Order of the Hospital of St. John of Jerusalem (The Order of St. John) for humanitarian work in animal assisted interventions, at the Senate of Canada, Ottawa, ON
- 2018 - Lady Justice Award, Elizabeth Fry Society of Saskatchewan
- 2022 - Distinguished Graduate Mentor Award - University of Saskatchewan, College of Graduate and Postdoctoral Studies
- 2022 - Appointment as Officer (Investiture Recipient) to The Most Venerable Order of the Hospital of St. John of Jerusalem (The Order of St. John), at Governor‘s House in Regina, SK
- 2023 - Queen Elizabeth II Platinum Jubilee Medal (SK) in the field of Health Care Research

== Bibliography ==
=== Selected articles ===
- Eshrati, B., Asl, R., Dell, C., Afshar, P., Millson, P., Kamali, M., Weekes, J. (2008). Preventing HIV Transmission Among Iranian Prisoners: Initial Support for Providing Education on the Benefits of Harm Reduction Practices. Harm Reduction Journal, 5(1), 1-7. Preventing HIV transmission among Iranian prisoners: Initial support for providing education on the benefits of harm reduction practices
- Dell, C., Lyons, T., Cayer, K.. (2010). The Role of ‘Kijigabandan’ and ‘Manadjitowin’ in Understanding Harm Reduction Policies and Programs for Aboriginal Peoples”. Native Social Work Journal. 7, 109-138.
- Dell, C., Gust, S., MacLean, S. (2011). Special Issue on Volatile Substance Misuse: A Global Perspective. Substance Use & Misuse: An International Interdisciplinary Forum. 47(S1), 1-143. DOI: 10.3109/10826084.2011.580169
- Dell, C., Kilty, J. (2013). The Creation of the Expected Aboriginal Woman Drug Offender in Canada: Exploring Relations between Victimization, Punishment, and Cultural Identity. International Review of Victimology. 19(1), 51-68. The creation of the expected Aboriginal woman drug offender in Canada: Exploring relations between victimization, punishment, and cultural identity
- Fiedeldey-Van Dijk, C., Rowan, M., Dell, C., Hopkins, C., Fornssler, B., Hall, L., Mykkota, D., Mushquash, C., Farag, M., Shea, B. (2015). Honouring Indigenous Culture-as-Intervention: Development and Validity Evidence of the Native Wellness Assessment (NWA™)”. Journal of Ethnicity in Substance Abuse. 1-38. doi: 10.1080/15332640.2015.1119774.
- Anna-Belle the Therapy Dog, with the assistance of Dell, C., Sewap, G., McAllister, B., Bachiu, J. (2018). “She Makes Me Feel Comfortable”: Understanding the Impacts of Animal Assisted Therapy at a Methadone Clinic”. Canadian Journal of Aboriginal HIV/AIDS Community-Based Research. 9, 57-65.
- Kosteniuk, B., Dell, C. (2020). How Companion Animals Support Recovery from Opioid Addiction: An Exploratory Study of Patients in a Methadone Maintenance Treatment Program. APORIA Journal. 12(1), 91-108. How Companion Animals Support Recovery from Opioid Use Disorder: An Exploratory Study of Patients in a Methadone Maintenance Treatment Program
- Williamson, L., Dell, C., Osgood, N., Chalmers, D., Lohnes, C., Carleton, N., Asmundson, G. (2021). Examining Changes in Posttraumatic Stress Disorder Symptoms and Substance Use among a Sample of Canadian Veterans Working with Service Dogs: An Exploratory Patient-oriented Longitudinal study. Journal of Veterans Studies, 9(11), 1-13. Examining Changes in Posttraumatic Stress Disorder Symptoms and Substance Use Among a Sample of Canadian Veterans Working with Service Dogs: An Exploratory Patient- Oriented Longitudinal Study.
- Dell, C., Williamson, L., McKenzie, H., Mela, M., Akca, D., Cruz, M., Ramsum, T., Sultana, S., Camacho Soto, N., & Mostafa, K. (2022). Conducting Patient Oriented Research (POR) in a Forensic Psychiatric Facility: A Case Study of Patient Involvement. International Journal of Forensic Mental Health. 1-15. DOI: 10.1080/14999013.2022.2080305
- Carey, B. Dell, C., Stempien, J., Tupper, S., Rohr, B., Carr, E., Cruz, M., Acoose, S., Butt, P., Broberg, L., Collard, L., Fele-Slaferek, L., Fornssler, C., Goodridge, D., Gunderson, J., McKenzie, H., Rubin, J., Shand, J., Smith, J., Trask, J., Ukrainetz, K. (2022). Outcomes of a Controlled Trial with Visiting Therapy Dog Teams on Pain in Adults in an Emergency Department. PLoS One. 1-24. 17(3):e0262599. doi: 10.1371/journal.pone.0262599.
