= Constance Rooke =

Canadian academic (1942–2008)

5th President of the University of Winnipeg
- In office October 1999 – December 2002
- Preceded by: Marsha Hanen
- Succeeded by: Patrick Deane

Personal details
- Born: November 14, 1942 New York City, United States
- Died: October 4, 2008 (age 65) Toronto,Ontario, Canada

Constance Rooke (November 14, 1942 – October 4, 2008) was a Canadian academic who was President and Vice-Chancellor of the University of Winnipeg from 1999 to 2002.

== Life ==
Rooke was born in New York City on November 14, 1942. she graduated from Smith College in 1964, with a Bachelor of Arts, and from Tulane University in 1966, with her masters. She obtained her Ph.D. from the University of North Carolina in 1973. Together with her husband Leon Rooke, she moved to Victoria, British Columbia in 1973. She taught in the English department at the University of Victoria, and served as the first Chair of the Women's Studies Department. In 1988, she became an English professor at the University of Guelph. In 1994, Rooke was named associate vice-president (academic) at the University of Guelph.

On October 17 1999, Rooke was named as the 5th president of the University of Winnipeg. In this capacity she aimed to expand the involvement of the University within the surrounding community and broaden its cultural reach. Under Rooke, the university was able to raise its status nationally, and improve student housing. However, in January 2002, The University began to struggle to maintain its finances. The university's deficit was reported to be at 3.2 million. The provincial NDP government of Gary Doer refused to pay off the debit for the university because of the precedent it could set, leaving the university to balance the budget itself. Despite the financial situation of the university, Rooke announced a 34 million dollar construction project, something which put her into conflict with the university's board of regents. She also came into conflict with the provincial government after she blamed the lack of government funds for the university's financial situation. By December 2002, the board of regents removed Rooke from her position as university president.

After losing her position at the University of Winnipeg, she served as the president of PEN Canada, and returned to the University of Guelph as the director of the Master of Fine Arts in Creative Writing program.

On October 4, 2008 Rooke died of ovarian cancer in Toronto.
