= University of Winnipeg =

Public university in Winnipeg, Manitoba, Canada

Coordinates: 49°53′24.44″N 97°9′12.12″W

The University of Winnipeg
- Motto: Lux et Veritas Floreant
- Motto in English: Let Light and Truth Flourish
- Type: Public
- Established: 1938 as United College; 1967 as University of Winnipeg
- Affiliations: AUCC; IAU; ATS; U Sports; CWUAA; UArctic; Campus Manitoba; CUP
- Endowment: $108 million
- Chancellor: Barb Gamey
- President: Jino Distasio (interim)
- Academic staff: 340
- Administrative staff: 489
- Students: 9,028
- Undergraduates: 8,776
- Postgraduates: 252
- Location: Winnipeg, Manitoba, Canada
- Campus: Urban
- Language: English
- Mascot: Wes Lee Coyote
- Sports team: Winnipeg Wesmen
- Website: uwinnipeg.ca

The University of Winnipeg (UWinnipeg, UW, or U of W) is a public research university in Winnipeg, Manitoba, Canada. It offers undergraduate programs in art, business, economics, education, science and applied health as well as graduate programs. UWinnipeg's founding colleges were Manitoba College and Wesley College, which merged to form United College in 1938. The University of Winnipeg was established in 1967 when United College received its charter.

The governance was modelled on the provincial University of Toronto Act of 1906 which established a bicameral system of university government consisting of a senate (faculty), responsible for academic policy, and a board of governors (citizens) exercising exclusive control over financial policy and having formal authority in all other matters. The president, appointed by the board, was a link between the bodies to perform institutional leadership.

The university is a member of the Association of Universities and Colleges of Canada (AUCC), the Association of Commonwealth Universities (ACU), the Canadian University Society for Intercollegiate Debate (CUSID) and a member of U Sports.

== History ==
The UW's founding colleges were Manitoba College, founded in 1871, and Wesley College, founded in 1888, which merged to form United College in 1938. In 1967, United College received a charter and became the University of Winnipeg. George Creeford Browne (architect) & S. Frank Peters designed Wesley Hall (1894–5), which is now part of the University of Winnipeg.

The University of Winnipeg was established on 1 July 1967 when United College received its charter. United College was formed in 1938 from the union of Manitoba College, founded in 1871, and Wesley College, founded in 1888. Originally affiliated with the University of Manitoba, United College received its charter in 1967 and became the University of Winnipeg.

== Campus ==
The campus of The University of Winnipeg is made up of 23 buildings spreading over several full blocks of Downtown Winnipeg, located directly on Portage Avenue. Over the past decade, the campus has undergone over 10 new building construction or major renovation projects. Through its revitalization, the university has become an engine for downtown renewal and improvement.

The Rice Centre is the home of the university's administration and student services.

The Buhler Centre was constructed to house the Faculty of Business and Economics, as well as PACE (Professional, Applied and Continuing Education), a division of the University of Winnipeg. The doors to the Buhler Centre opened September 2010. Designed by PSA+DPA+DIN collective a collaborative effort between Peter Sampson Architecture Studio inc, David Penner Architect, and DIN Projects. The Buhler Centre also houses the Plug In Institute of Contemporary Art and Stella's Cafe on the main floor.

McFeetors Hall: Great-West Life Student Residence is a student dormitory. It was partially funded by Raymond L. McFeetors, Chairman of The Great West Life Assurance Company who donated $2.67 Million for a dormitory to be built on newly acquired property west of the campus. The money came from his personal resources and from Great West Life.

The Asper Centre for Theatre and Film provides facilities for theatre and media studies.

The Axworthy Health & RecPlex opened in 2014. It offers a range of sport and recreation facilities.

Leatherdale Hall is a shared multi-use building that is mainly used by the collegiate.

Downtown Commons which is located on Colony Street is a 14-storey apartment complex that offers accommodation for students and others.

Wesley Hall is a stone-clad brick structure built in 1894–95 and is on the Registry of Historic Places of Canada. It is located on 515 Portage Ave. near Portage Place Mall. The institute for stained glass in Canada has documented the stained glass at the University of Winnipeg. Specifically at the convocation hall.

=== Campus development ===
Campus development at the University of Winnipeg is overseen by the University of Winnipeg Community Renewal Corporation (UWCRC), a not-for-profit subsidiary of the university. The UWCRC manages planning, construction, and redevelopment projects with a stated focus on environmental, social, economic, and cultural sustainability.

==== Governance ====
The UWCRC board is chaired by the university’s president. The corporation operates at arm’s length from traditional university governance structures, a model that has been described as uncommon among Canadian post-secondary institutions. In addition to university projects, the UWCRC undertakes real-estate development and provides project and property management services for other post-secondary institutions, non-profit organizations, and First Nations partners.

==== Major projects ====
Recent development initiatives include:

- Asper Centre for Theatre and Film
- Richardson College for the Environment and Science Complex
- Axworthy Health and RecPlex
- McFeetors Hall (student residence)
- UWSA Daycare

A 14-storey mixed-use apartment complex for students and community residents began construction in 2015.

==== Financial structure ====
The UWCRC’s financial statements are not subject to public disclosure legislation. Its operating funds are drawn from the university’s budget.

University of Winnipeg campus buildings

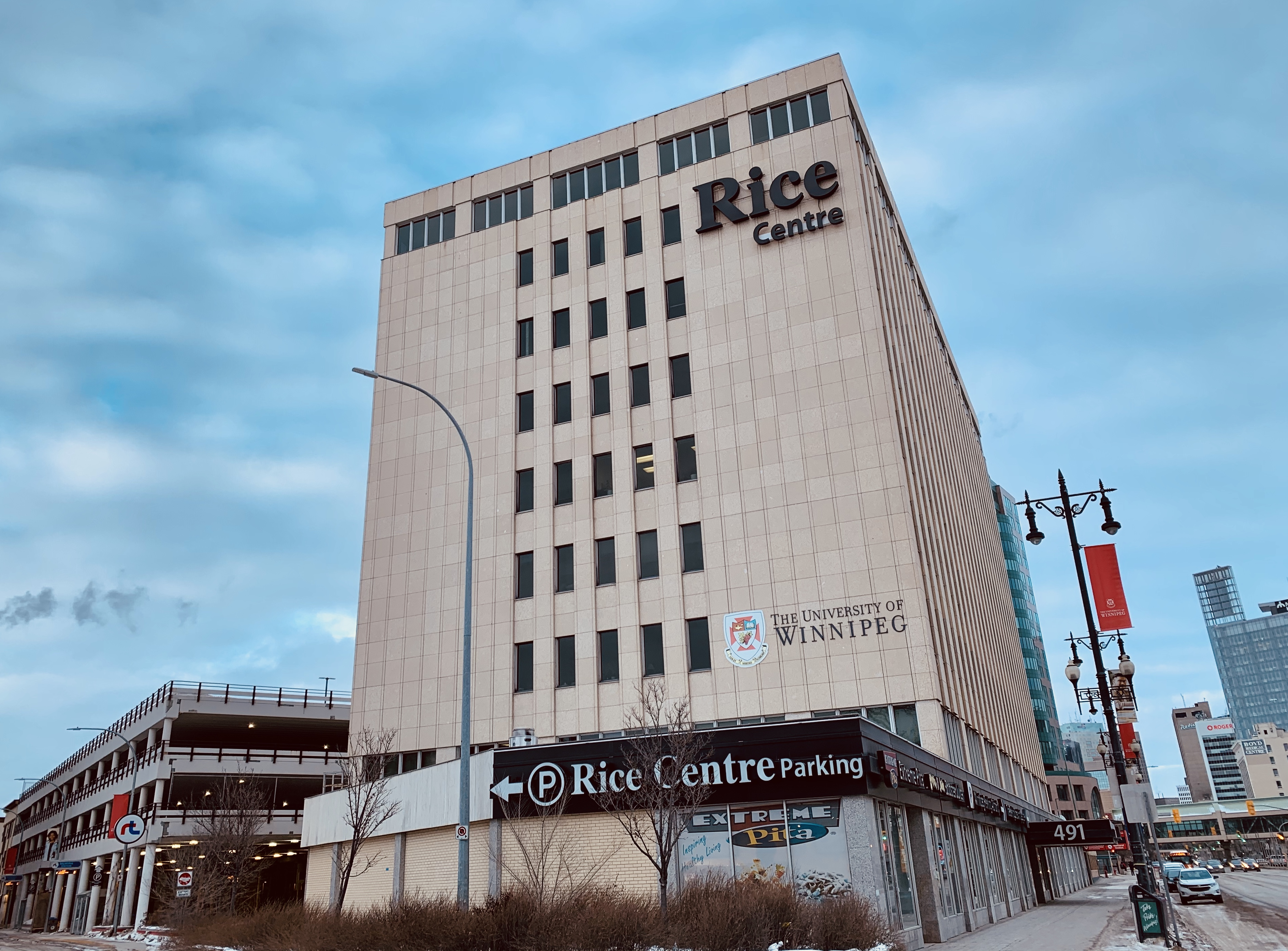
Rice Centre

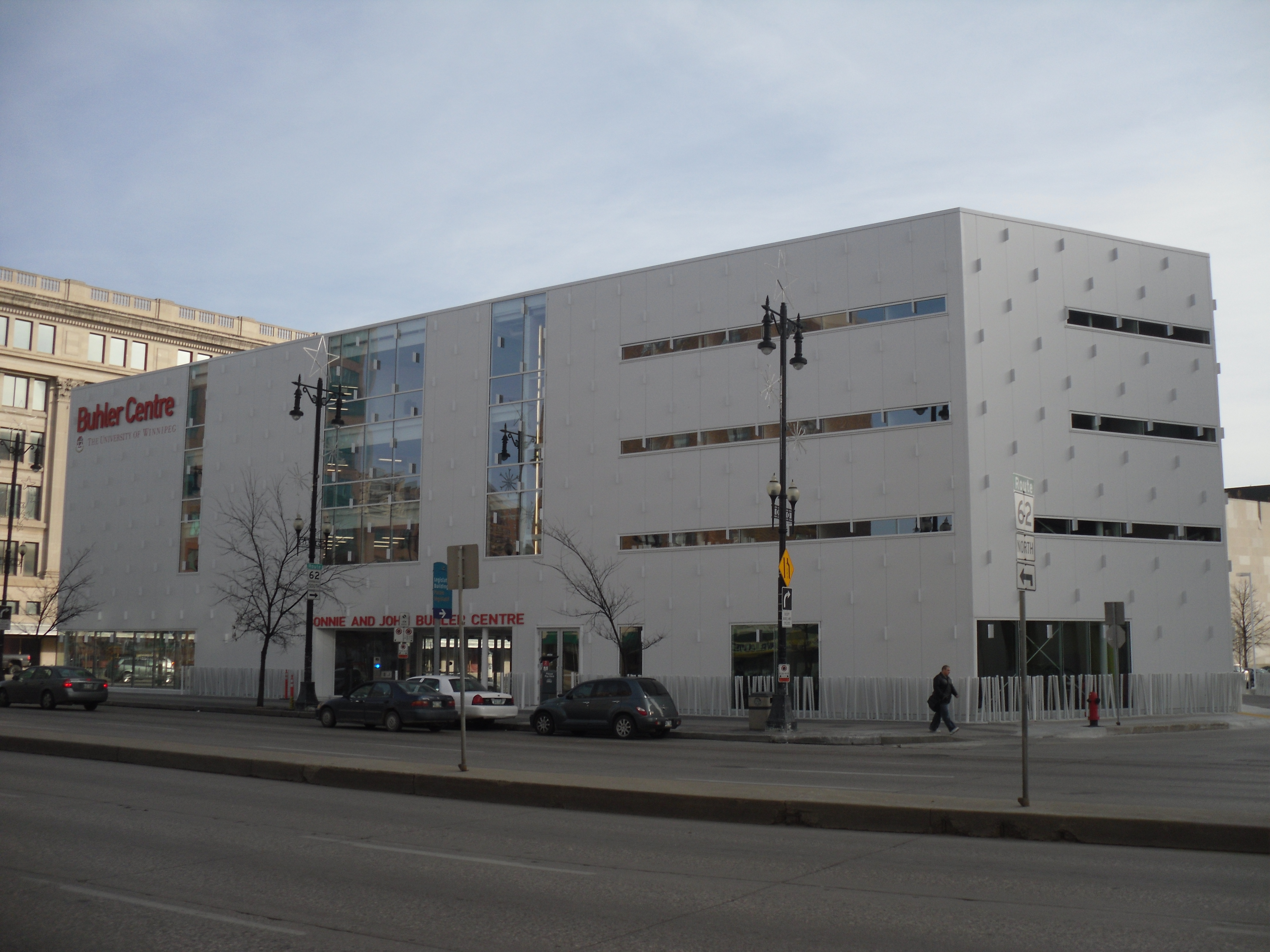
Buhler Centre

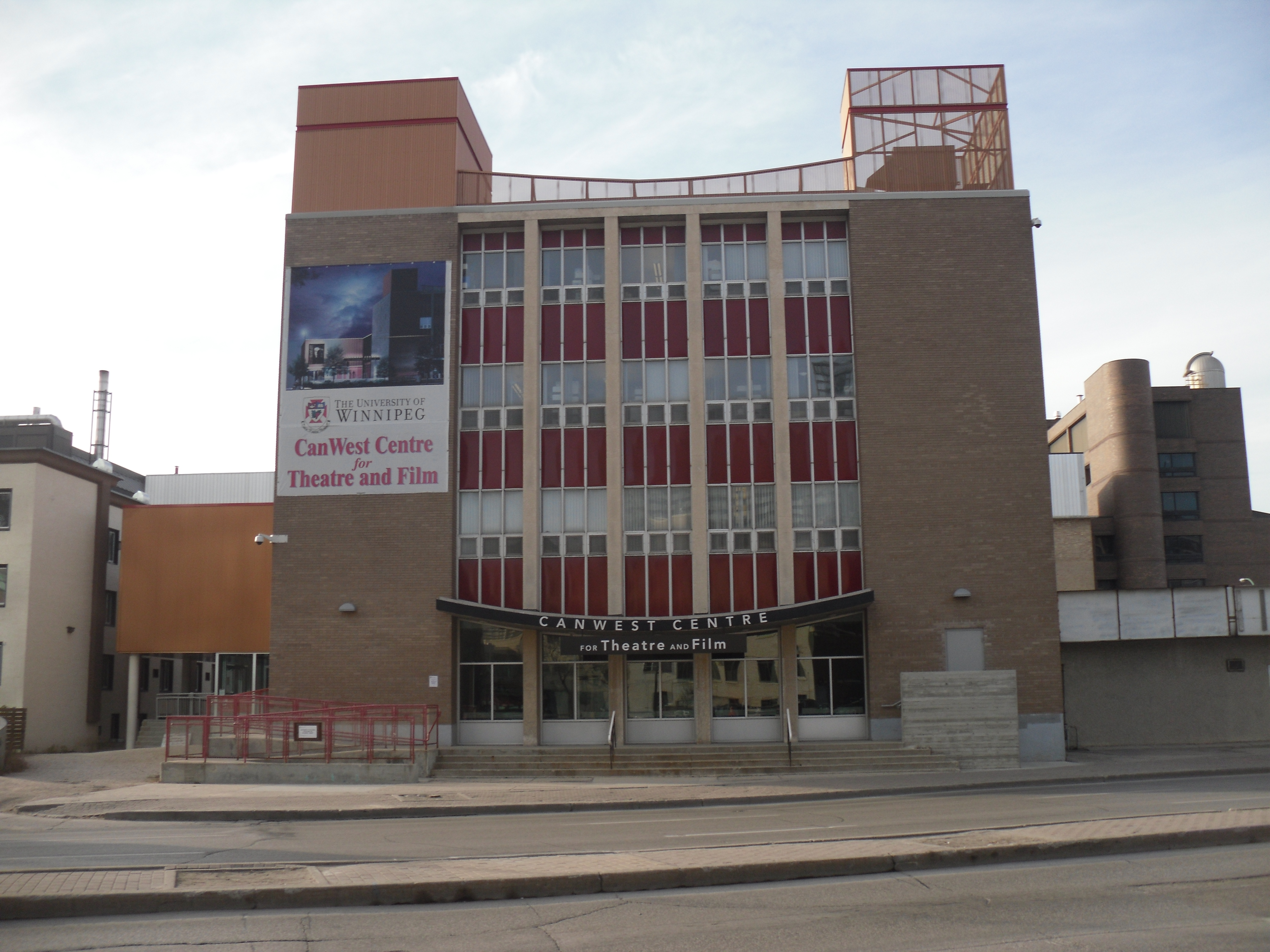
Asper Centre for Theatre and Film

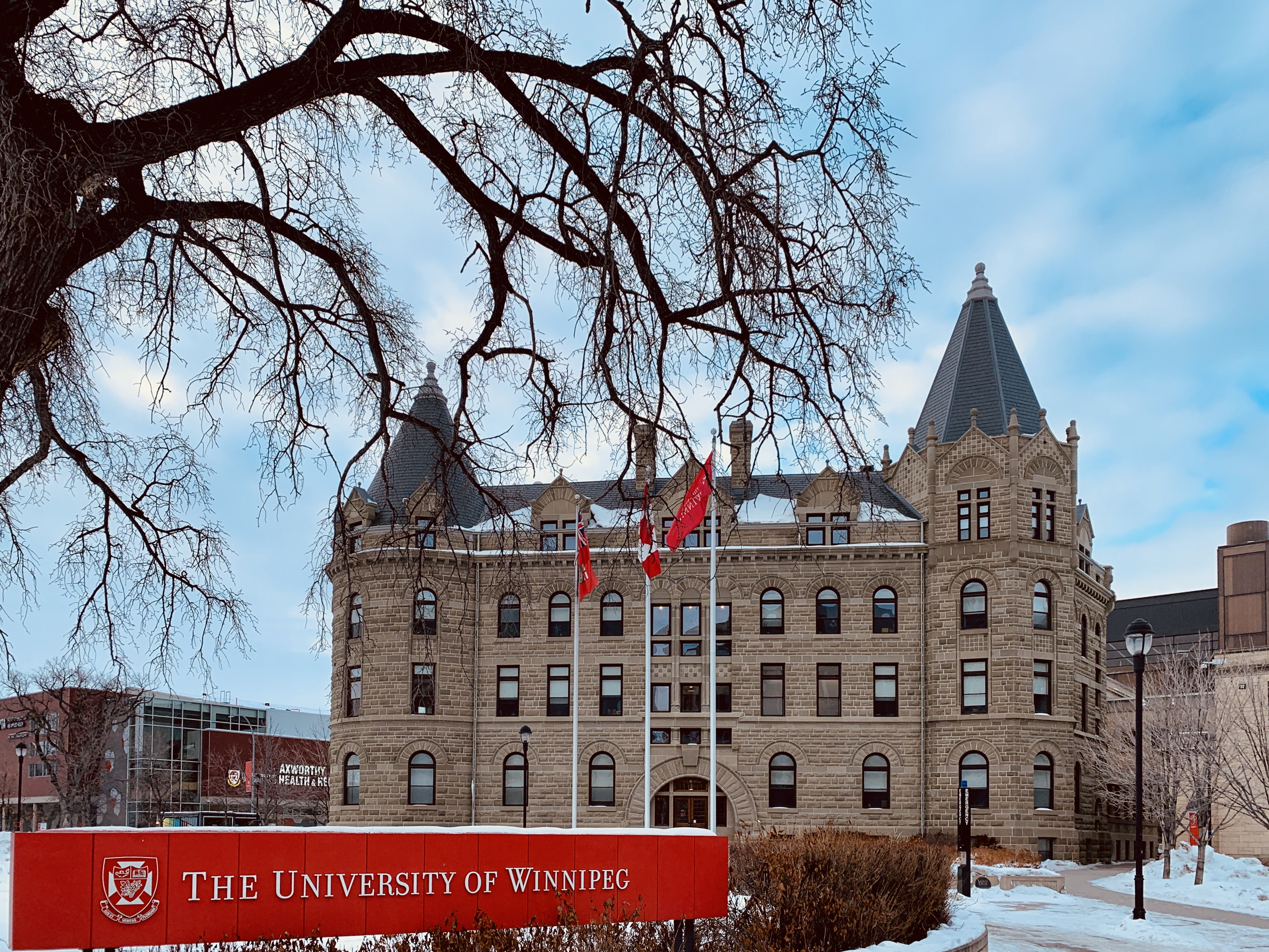
Main building

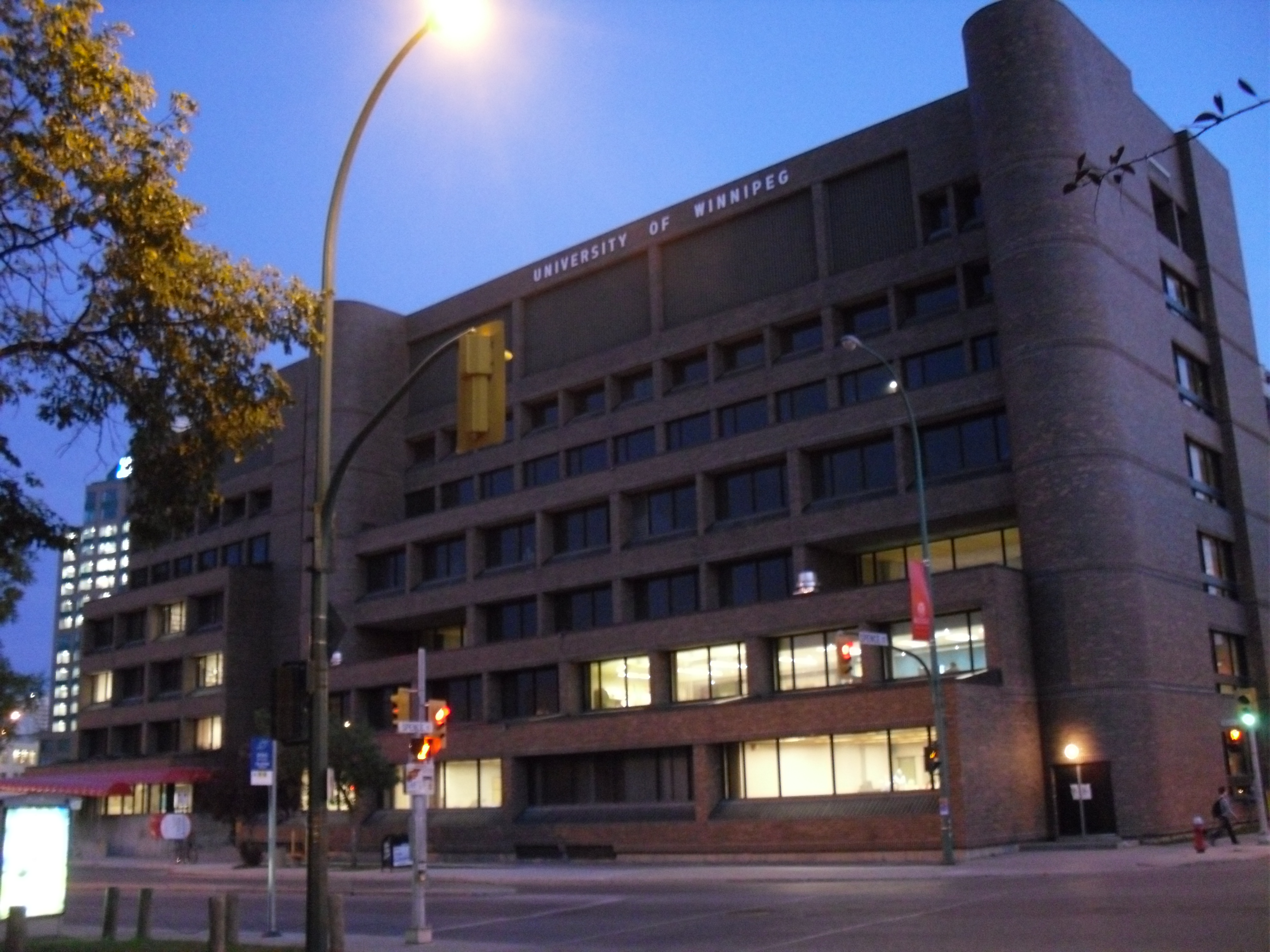
View from Ellice Avenue

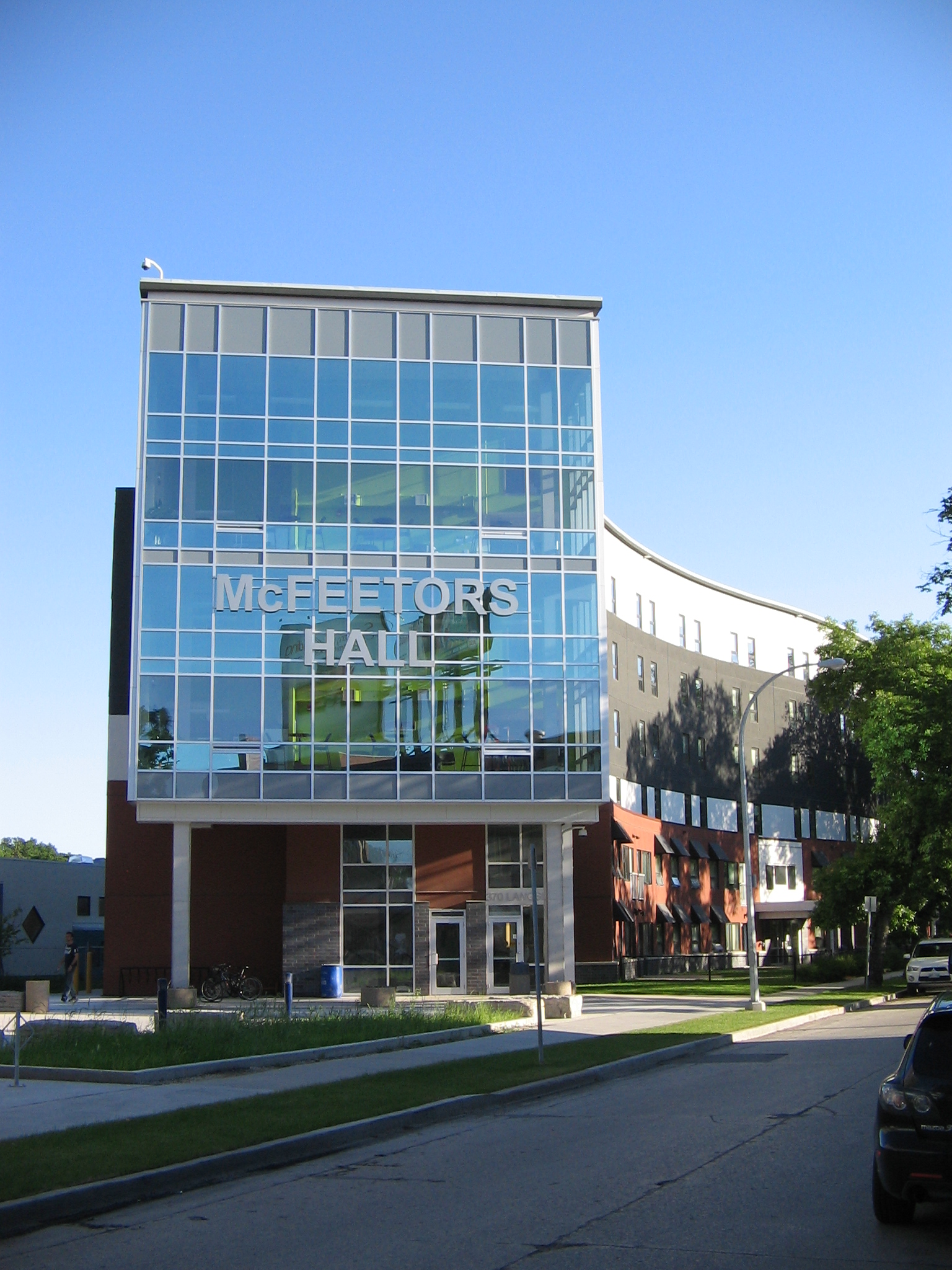
McFeetors Hall

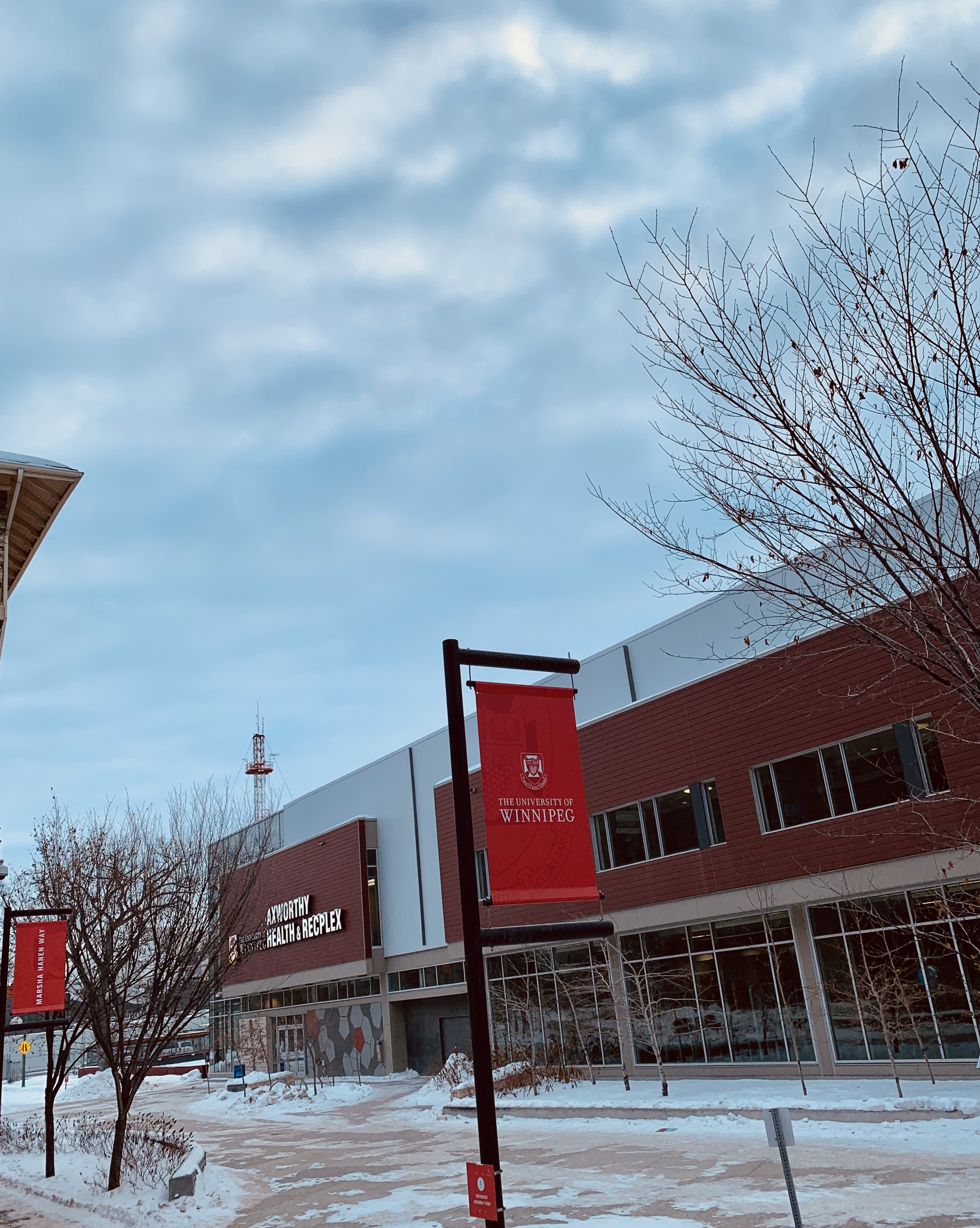
Marsha Hanen Way

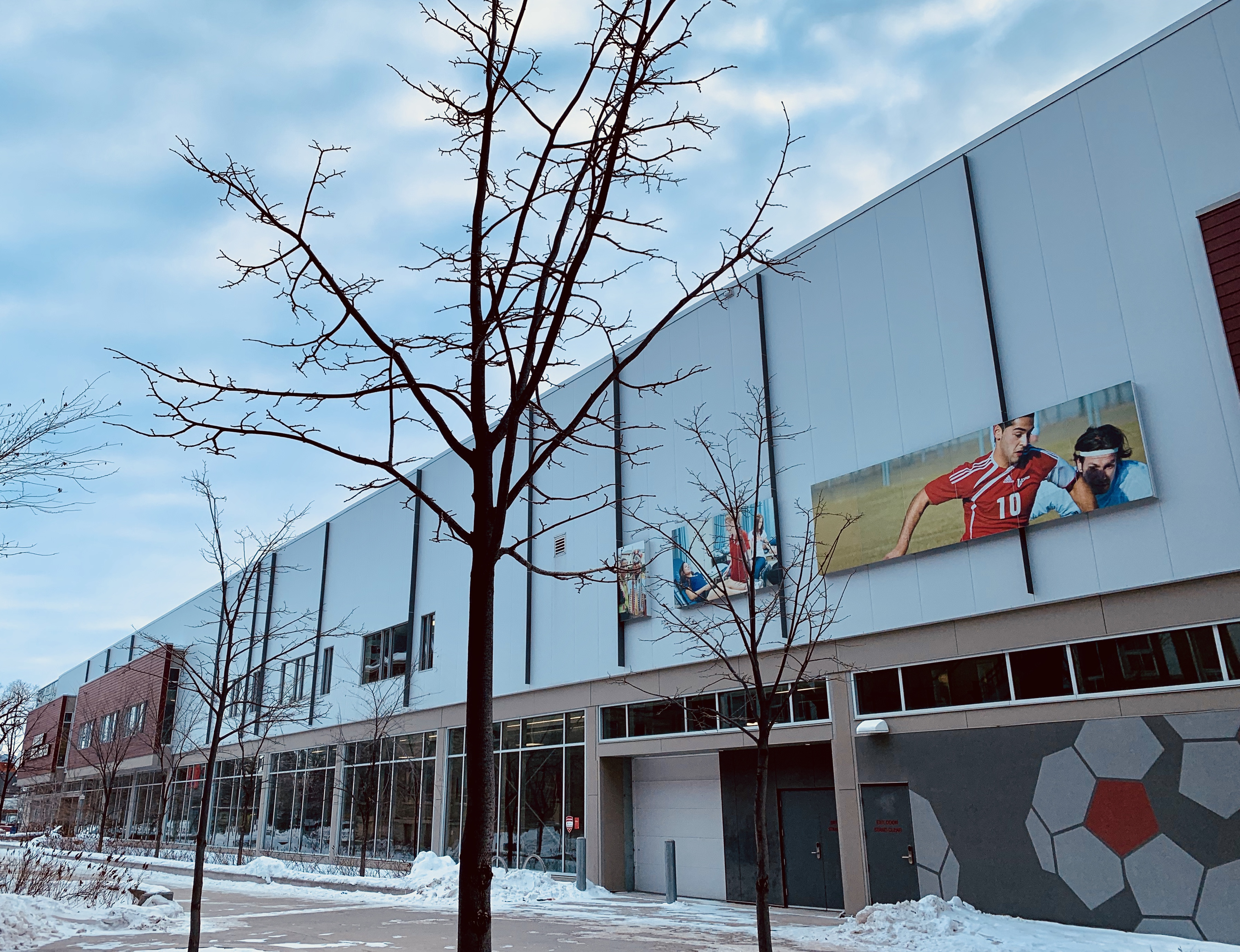
Axworthy Health & RecPlex

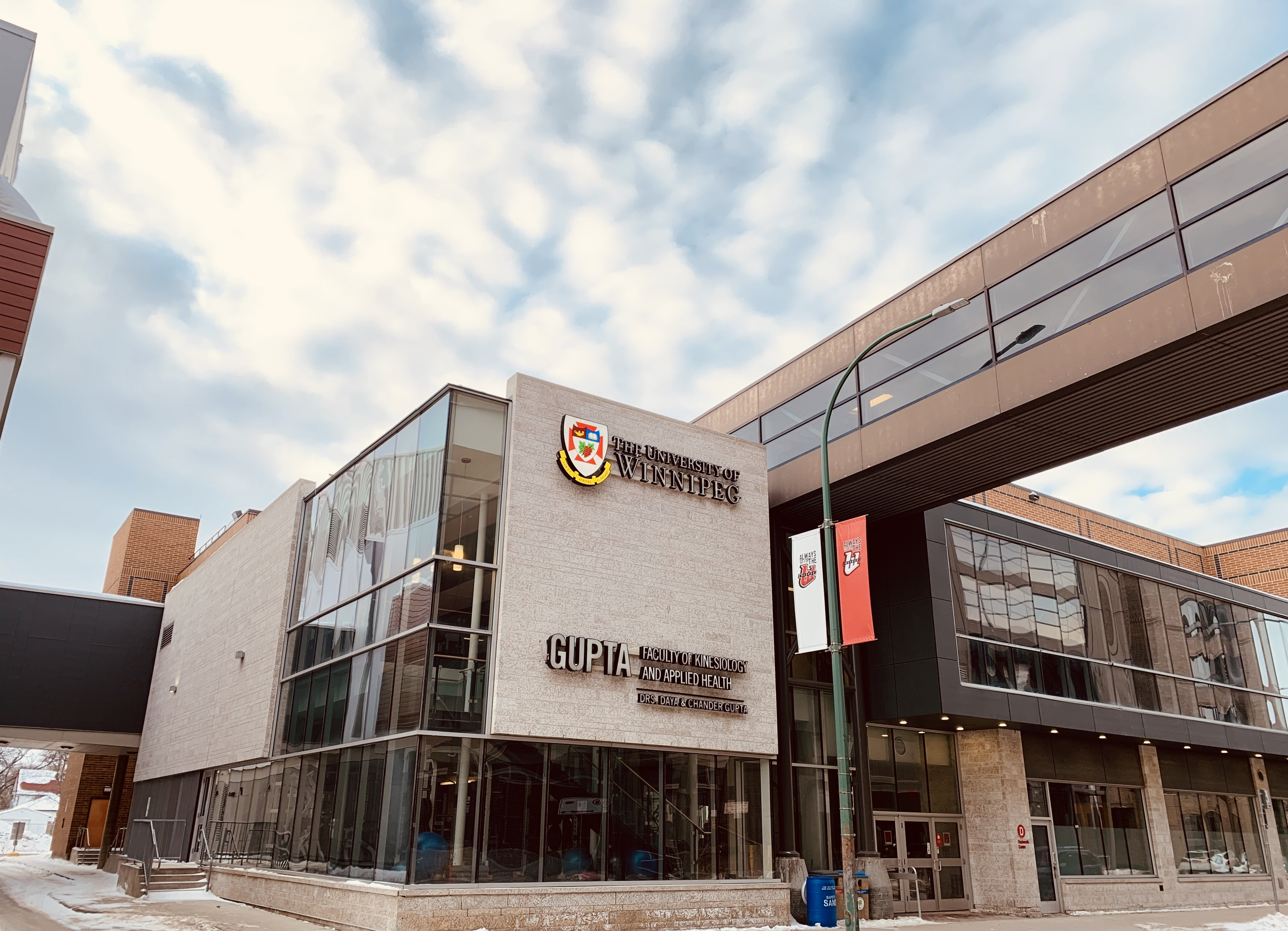
Duckworth Athletic Centre and Bill Wedlake Fitness Centre

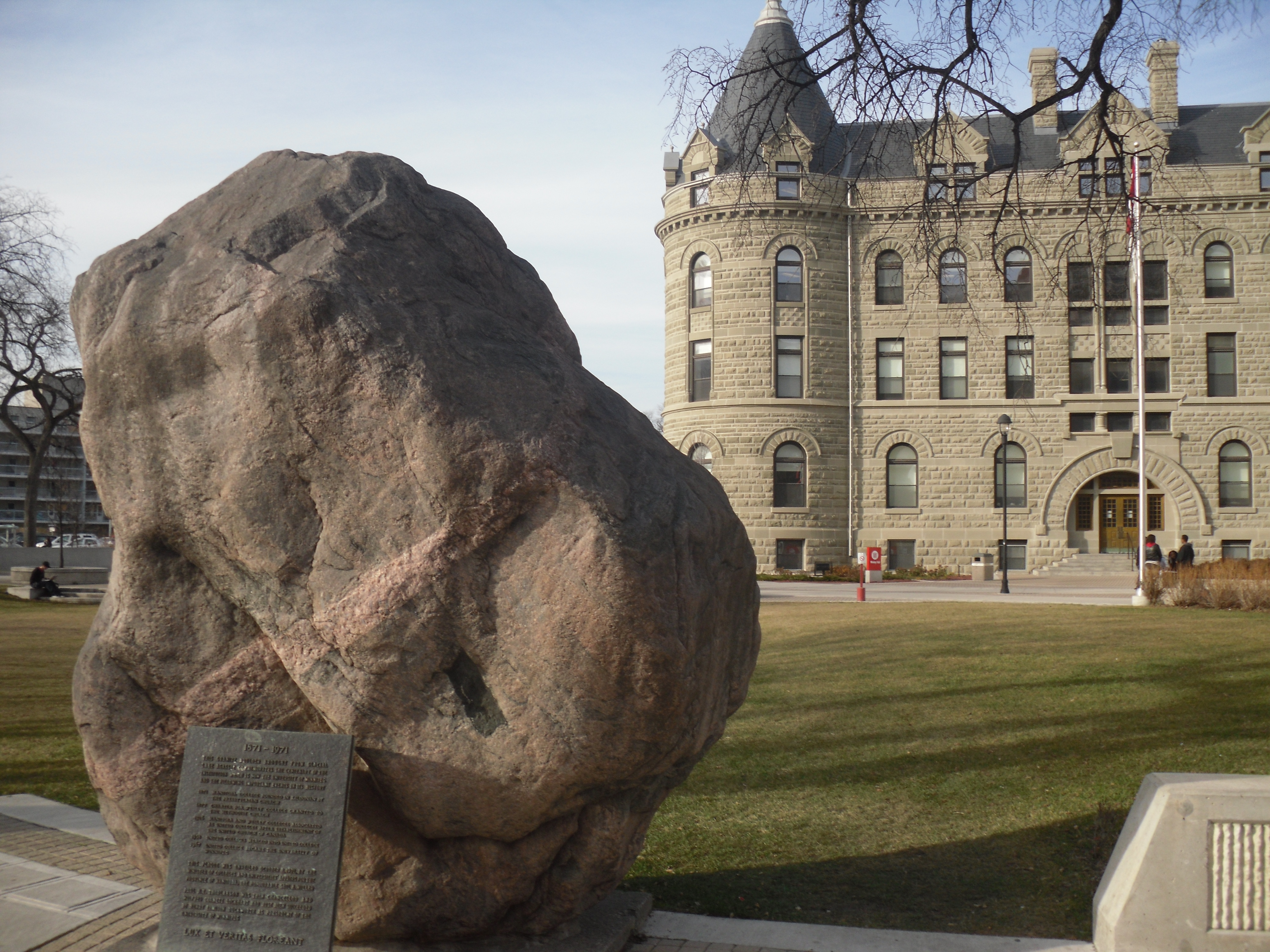
Granite boulder on the front lawn

== Academic ==
The University of Winnipeg is a provincially and privately funded post-secondary institution with undergraduate and a growing number of graduate programs including Canada's only master's degree in development practice with a focus on Indigenous development, as well as a professional, applied and continuing education and a high school division.

=== Students and faculty ===
Students at the university are represented by the University of Winnipeg Students' Association. CKUW is the student radio station based at the University of Winnipeg. The Uniter is the campus newspaper. The Student Services staff are represented by AESES.

=== Faculties ===
- Faculty of Arts (34% of undergraduate students) offers Honours degree programs in Classics (Greek and Roman Studies), Conflict Resolution Studies, Criminal Justice, Developmental Studies, Disability Studies, English, French Studies, German Studies, History, History of Art, Human Rights, Indigenous Studies, Interdisciplinary Linguistics, International Development Studies, Mennonite Studies, Philosophy, Political Science, Psychology, Religion & Culture, Rhetoric, Writing and Communications, Sociology, Spanish Studies, Theatre & Film, Urban and Inner-City Studies, Women's & Gender Studies.
- Faculty of Business and Economics (14% of undergraduate students) offers undergraduate programs in Business & Administration, Economics, Economics and Finance. It also offers a joint program with Red River College.
- Faculty of Education (17% of undergraduate students)
- Gupta Faculty of Kinesiology and Applied Health (6% of undergraduate students) offers programs in Kinesiology, Physical and Health Education, Athletic Therapy.
- Faculty of Science (19% of undergraduate students) offers programs in Applied Computer Science, Bioanthropology, Biochemistry, Biology, Chemistry, Environmental Studies and Sciences, Geography, Mathematics, Neuroscience, Physics, Psychiatric Nursing, Statistics.
- Faculty of Graduate Studies offers a growing number of graduate programs. These include Masters of Arts programs in Applied Economics, Cultural Studies, Indigenous Governance, Environmental and Social Change, and Criminal Justice (As of 2018), Master of Science programs in Applied Computer Science and Society, and Bioscience, Technology and Public Policy; Professional Programs in Indigenous Development, and Technology, Innovation and Operations. It also offers several joint programs with the University of Manitoba. These include Masters programs in History, Public Administration, Religious Studies and in Peace and Conflict Studies There are several Postgraduate certificates: Higher Education Teaching Certificate and the Postgraduate Professional Skills Certificate
- United Centre for Theological Studies offers a variety of courses in theology. The Masters in Sacred Theology and Master of Arts Spiritual Disciplines & Ministry Practices are under review.

=== Colleges ===
There are three interdisciplinary colleges located on the campus:

- Global College is an interdisciplinary centre designed to bring together students, faculty and international visitors in dialogue about global citizenship. It hosts a BA in Human Rights and MAs in Indigenous Development and Peace & Conflict Studies.
- Menno Simons College is a centre for International Development Studies and Conflict Resolution Studies. It is located on the UofW campus and is a program of Canadian Mennonite University in affiliation with the University of Winnipeg.
- Richardson College for the Environment is a modern science research facility conducting research in biology, chemistry, environmental studies, Indigenous science and the social sciences. It is one of the most energy efficient educational buildings in North America.

=== Research ===
The university has a growing research profile. Research grant income rose from $6M in 2015-16 to $12M in 2019-20. It has established a number of research centres including the Centre for Access to Information and Justice (CAIJ), the Centre for Forest Interdisciplinary Research (C-FIR), the Centre for Research in Cultural Studies (CRiCS), and the Centre for Research in Young People's Texts and Cultures (CRYTC).

It has Canada Research Chairs in Fundamental Symmetries in Subatomic Physics, Quantum Materials Discovery, Culture and Public Memory, Human-Environment Interactions, Health & Culture, Indigenous People, History and Archives, Environmental Influences on Water Quality, and in Indigenous Arts, Collaboration and Digital Media.

The university is an active member of the University of the Arctic. UArctic is an international cooperative network based in the Circumpolar Arctic region, consisting of more than 200 universities, colleges, and other organizations with an interest in promoting education and research in the Arctic region.

=== Reputation ===
University rankings

World rankings

Canadian rankings
- Maclean's Undergraduate: 13
- Maclean's Reputation: 35

In Maclean's 2023 rankings, the university was ranked 13th out of 19 primarily undergraduate universities.

== Indigenous UWinnipeg ==
The University of Winnipeg offers several programs and services to Indigenous people. It is the first university to mandate that all students take an Indigenous course requirement as part of their degree. The course was added by the University of Winnipeg in support and compliance with the recommendations by the Truth and Reconciliation Commission of Canada.

The University of Winnipeg offers a Bachelor of Arts in Indigenous Studies with a master's degree in Indigenous Governance. The University of Winnipeg provides special first-year bridging programs for Aboriginal students. Academic counsellors, tutors, and Aboriginal Elders are present on campus to provide academic and social supports, as offered by The Aboriginal Student Services Center (ASSC) on campus.

Through its Wii Chiiwaaknak Learning Centre, Eco-Kids Program and Eco-U Summer Camp services, the University of Winnipeg actively partners with Aboriginal communities. The University of Winnipeg is now offering the only master's degree in Development Practice with a focus on Indigenous Development in the world, joining a network of 22 prestigious universities globally with support from the MacArthur Foundation.

In 2012, the university named broadcaster Wab Kinew as its first Director of Aboriginal Inclusion, a position designed to oversee the expansion of culturally inclusive outreach efforts and program development in First Nations education.

== The Collegiate ==
The Collegiate at The University of Winnipeg is an on-site high school that offers Grades 9, 10, 11, and 12 programs. It is an independent school and a division of The University of Winnipeg. It offers an admission process intended to accelerate admission into first year university for Collegiate Students. As of 2020, there are 376 students at The Collegiate.

The Collegiate was created within Wesley College in 1873. At the time it was the only secondary school in Manitoba.

== Athletics ==
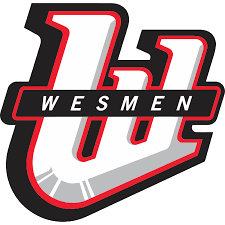
Winnipeg athletics logo

The university is represented in U Sports by the "Winnipeg Wesmen" in basketball, soccer, and volleyball. The U of W built a new field house (" The RecPlex"), named after Lloyd Axworthy, adjacent to the Duckworth Centre that provides indoor soccer services and smoothies.

=== Great Rock Climb ===
The University of Winnipeg has held their annual UWinnipeg Duckworth Great Rock Climb for over 67 years. The rock climb is traditionally held at the beginning of classes each year, on the front lawn of Portage Commons. The competition involves teams of three racing from Wesley Hall to the granite boulder monument on campus. The team to run and climb the rock the fastest wins. The fastest record was made at 9.4 seconds in 1979.

== Library, museum, archives, and art gallery ==
The University of Winnipeg Library supports the teaching and research needs of the university community through consultation services, research materials access, and spaces for study. In addition to administration of the library, The dean of the library manages a portfolio that includes the copyright office, archives, art gallery, anthropology museum, and WinnSpace, the university's institutional repository. The library facility occupies the 4th and 5th floors of Centennial Hall, which was featured on the March 1973 cover of Progressive Architecture.

The Anthropology Museum holds collections in ethnology, archaeology, primatology and hominid osteology which support the research, teaching, and public service functions of the Anthropology Department.

The University of Winnipeg Archives preserves and provides access to the records of the University of Winnipeg, as well as aspects of Manitoba history relevant to research at the University of Winnipeg, including social justice and human rights.

Gallery 1C03 is the campus art gallery, located in Centennial Hall. The mission of the gallery is to, "engage diverse communities through the development and presentation of contemporary and historical art exhibitions and related programming initiatives." The gallery shows Manitoban, Canadian as well as international artists. The gallery also works to develop, preserve and present the university's art collection.

== People ==
=== Chancellors ===
- Paul Thorlakson (1969–1978)
- Roderick O.A. Hunter (1978–1984)
- W. John A. Bulman (1984–1996)
- Carol Shields (1996–2000)
- H. Sanford Riley (2000–2009)
- Bob Silver (2009–2020)
- Barb Gamey (2020–present)

=== Presidents ===
- Wilfred Lockhart (1967–1971)
- Henry Duckworth (1971–1981)
- Robin Farquhar (1981–1989)
- Marsha Hanen (1989–1999)
- Constance Rooke (1999–2003)
- Patrick Deane (2003–2004; Interim President)
- Lloyd Axworthy (2004–2014)
- Annette Trimbee (2014–2020)
- James Currie (2020–2022; Interim President)
- Todd Mondor (2022–2025)
- Jino Distasio (2025–Present; Interim President)

=== Notable faculty ===
- Tim Ball, geographer and public speaker
- Bill Blaikie, former politician, leader of the New Democratic Party and adjunct professor of Theology and Politics
- Cal Botterill, sports psychologist
- Jennifer S.H. Brown, Tier 1 Canada Research Chair for Aboriginal Peoples in an Urban and Regional Context and Fellow of the Royal Society of Canada
- Nora Decter, novelist
- Mark Golden, historian
- Trudy Govier, philosopher
- Catherine Hunter, poet, novelist and professor of creative writing
- Wab Kinew, broadcaster and politician
- Sandra Kirby, sociologist
- Royden Loewen, scholar in the field of Mennonite history
- Arthur R. M. Lower, historian
- Ian MacPherson, historian
- Diane McGifford, historian and politician
- Hope McIntyre, playwright
- Marilou McPhedran, lawyer
- Vesna Milosevic-Zdjelar, astrophysicist, science educator
- Ortrud Oellermann, mathematician
- Lara Rae, an instructor in the Department of Women's and Gender Studies
- Al Reimer, literary critic
- Mavis Reimer, Canada Research Chair in Young People's Texts and Cultures, 2005-2015
- Michael Weinrath, founding chair (2004 to 2012) of Criminal Justice and Interdisciplinary Criminology, inaugural director (2013) of the Justice Research Institute
- Albert Welter, scholar of Buddhism
- Jenny Heijun Wills, creative writer
- Robert J. Young, historian

=== Notable alumni ===
- Ida Albo – businessperson
- Lloyd Axworthy – politician and former UW President, Nobel prize nominee
- Tom Axworthy – Canadian Civil Servant
- Omar Zakhilwal – Afghan Finance Minister as well as the Chief Economic Advisor to the President of Afghanistan
- David Bergen – Award-winning author (BEd 1985)
- Bill Blaikie – New Democratic Member of Parliament and provincial cabinet minister
- Margaret Bloodworth – National Security Advisor (BA 1970)
- Beth Cochran – basketball player and educator
- Alan Cross – radio personality
- Ruby Dhalla – Liberal Member of Parliament
- Aganetha Dyck – artist
- Jaimie Isaac - artist and curator
- Chantal Kreviazuk – singer/songwriter
- Margaret Laurence – Canadian novelist and short-story writer
- Guy Maddin – film director
- Don Newman – Award-winning journalist
- John Paskievich – film director and photographer
- Howard Pawley – former Premier of Manitoba
- Fred Penner – children's entertainer
- Madison Thomas – filmmaker
- Susan Thompson – former mayor of Winnipeg
- Brad Roberts – pop singer, Crash Test Dummies
- Bill Richardson – CBC radio host
- Erfan Nasajpour – professional basketball player
- Andrea Slobodian – reporter
- Sonia Sui – a model and actress in Taiwan
- Lois Wilson – first female Moderator of the United Church of Canada
- Vic Toews – Former Conservative MP and held different positions in Cabinet, Manitoba Judge
- Dave Weasel - Comedian
- Colleen Dell - Public sociologist

== University history ==
- A. Gerald Bedford, The University of Winnipeg: A History of the Founding Colleges, Toronto, University of Toronto Press, 1976
- Gerald Friesen, Principal J. H. Riddell: The Sane and Safe Leader of Wesley College, In Prairie Spirit: Perspectives on the Heritage of the United Church of Canada in the West, edited by Dennis L. Butcher, et al. Winnipeg, University of Manitoba Press, 1985.

== See also ==
- List of universities in the Canadian Prairies
- Higher education in Manitoba
- U Sports
- Canadian government scientific research organizations
- Canadian university scientific research organizations
- Canadian industrial research and development organizations
- Education in Canada
