= Marsha Hanen =

Canadian academic and university administrator (1936–2019)

4th President of University of Winnipeg
- In office 1989–1999
- Preceded by: Robin Hugh Farquhar; Ross McCormack (Interim)
- Succeeded by: Constance Rooke

Personal details
- Born: September 18, 1936 Calgary, Alberta
- Died: April 13, 2019 (aged 82) Victoria, British Columbia
- Education: Brown University; Brandeis University

Marsha Hanen, CM (September 18, 1936 – April 13, 2019) was a Canadian academic and former university administrator. She was President and Vice Chancellor of the University of Winnipeg from 1989 to 1999.

She received a Bachelor of Arts degree and a Master of Arts degree in philosophy from Brown University and a Ph.D. from Brandeis University. In 1989, Hanen became the fourth president of the University of Winnipeg. In this role, she led the establishment of a Bachelor of Education program at the university. She also oversaw the opening of the Bulman Student Centre and Eckhardt Gramatté Hall.

In 1998, she was made a Member of the Order of Canada in recognition for being "an inspiration to women in education, encouraging attitudinal change and innovation among academics, business leaders and lawmakers".

In 2018, the Spence Street Promenade was renamed Marsha Hanen Way in her honour.
