= Albert Welter =

Scholar of East Asian Buddhism (born 1952)

Albert Welter (born 1952) is a scholar of East Asian Buddhism, particularly Chinese Buddhism in the Tang to Song dynasty transition. Since 2013, he has served as Professor and Head of the East Asian Studies Department at the University of Arizona, Tucson, and was formerly Chair of the Department of Religion and Culture at the University of Winnipeg (Canada), where he also initiated the East Asian Languages and Cultures program.

Welter's work encompasses a broader interest in Chinese administrative policies toward Buddhism, including Chinese notions of secularism and their impact on religious beliefs and practices. His work also covers Buddhist interactions with Neo-Confucianism and literati culture. He is currently involved in the Hangzhou Region Buddhist Culture Project, supported by the Khyentse Foundation, in conjunction with Zhejiang University, the Hangzhou Academy of Social Sciences, and the Hangzhou Buddhist Academy.

Welter's monograph, A Tale of Two Stūpas: Histories of Hangzhou relic veneration through two of its most enduring monuments, is currently in press (Oxford). Another volume, The Future of China's Past: Reflections on the Meaning of China's Rise is under review. He has also received funding from the American Council of Learned Societies (with the support of the Chiang Ching-kuo Foundation) for an international conference, "Creating the World of Chan/ Sŏn /Zen: Chinese Chan Buddhism and its Spread throughout East Asia." Welter's research was supported for many years by the Social Sciences and Humanities Research Council of Canada, and is widely regarded as an expert in his area of scholarship.

Significant & Recent publications include:

- A Tale of Two Stūpas: Histories of Hangzhou relic veneration through two of its most enduring monuments (Oxford, accepted for publication).
- "Zen Master as Construction Entrepreneur and Preserver of Dharma: Eisai’s experience of Song Dynasty Chan in the Hangzhou Region." In Jean-Noël Robert, Ishii Seijun, and Chao Zhang, eds. Song-Dynasty Chan: Interdisciplinary Perspectives on an East Asian Buddhist Tradition. Paris: Editions Collège de France, Bibliothèque de l'Institut des hautes études japonaises. Accepted for publication.
- "Literati Chan at the Song Dynasty Court: The Role of Yang Yi in the Creation Chan Identity." Journal of Chinese Buddhist Studies. Accepted for publication.
- "Marking Buddhist Sacred Space: The Aśoka Stūpa Cult in Wuyue and at the Court of Song Emperor Taizong." In Jiang Wu, ed., The Formation of Regional Religious Systems (RRS) in Greater China. Leiden: Brill, in press.
- "Confucian Secularism in Theoretical and Historical Perspective," in Leerom Medovoi and Elizabeth Bentley, Eds., Religion, Secularism, and Political Belonging, Duke University Press, 2021. 69–84.
- "The 'Resurrection' of Yongming Yanshou in Ming Dynasty China: The Yongming Stūpa at Jingci Monastery." International Journal of Buddhist Thought & Culture Vol. 30, No. 1 (2020): 13–38.
- "The Role of Legalism and Militarism in the Making of Modern China," The Cross Cultural Thinkers （跨文化思想家）No. 2 (June, 2020): 96–110.
- "Yulu Formation in Chinese Chan: The Records of Qingyuan Xingsi and Nanyue Huairang." Journal of Chan Buddhism 1 (Brill, 2019): 77–145.
- The Administration of Buddhism in China: A Study and Translation of Zanning and his Topical Compendium of the Buddhist Order in China (Cambria, 2018); The Administration of Buddhism in China; https://www.youtube.com/watch?v=jqJKcl0ygU0)
- Religion, Culture and the Public Sphere in China and Japan, co-edited with Jeffrey Newmark (Palgrave Macmillan, 2017).
- “Confucian Monks and Buddhist Junzi: Zanning’s Da Song sent shilüe and the politics of Buddhist accommodation at the Song court.” In Thomas Jülch, Ed., The Middle Kingdom and the Dharma Wheel: Aspects of the Relationships between the Buddhist Saṃgha and the State in Chinese History. Leiden: Brill, 2016: 222–277.
- Yongming Yanshou's Conception of Chan in the Zongjing lu (Oxford, 2011).
- The Linji lu and the Creation of Chan Orthodoxy (Oxford, 2008).
- Monks, Rulers, and Literati: The Political Ascendancy of Chan Buddhism (Oxford, 2006).
