= Veterans studies =

Academic field

Veterans studies is an academic field that examines the diverse experiences of military veterans and their families in society. As a multidisciplinary field committed to advancing understanding of all aspects of the “veteran in society," inquiry draws on the intersections of the theoretical and the applied, the creative and the performative, the normative and the empirical. Topics within veterans studies could include but are not limited to combat exposure, reintegration challenges, and the complex systems and institutions that shape the "veteran experience." Veterans studies, by its very nature, may analyze experiences closely tied to military studies, but the emphasis of veterans studies is the “veteran experience,” that is, what happens after the service member departs the Armed Forces. Networking with other veterans through Department of War (DOW), having shared experiences with other veterans increases assimilation into civilian life, post service.

== Academic Programs in the United States ==
There are six universities that currently offer or have offered veterans studies programs in the United States.

=== Arizona State University ===
Initially, Arizona State University only offered the Veterans, Society and Service Certificate—an 18-credit, interdisciplinary certificate program offered online and on campus. As of November 2023, the university now offers the nation's first Bachelor of Arts in Applied Military and Veteran Studies. This interdisciplinary program aims to prepare students for careers in public leadership, service, and policy; counseling and counseling psychology; healthcare; and leadership within military and veteran organizations. It also highlights the historical context of military and veteran experiences.

=== Eastern Kentucky University ===
Eastern Kentucky University was the first university to offer an academic minor (18 credit hours) and certificate (24 credit hours) in veterans studies in 2010. "The certificate allows students to analyze the veteran’s role in society, emphasizing the intersectionality of veteran identity, equipping students with a variety of skills and disciplinary perspectives through which to develop the cultural competency needed to understand and interact with veterans in a variety of personal and professional settings."

=== Saint Leo University ===
The Department of Interdisciplinary Studies, within the College of Arts and Sciences, at Saint Leo University offers a bachelor's degree in Veteran Studies. This program claims to be the first of its kind, and emphasizes interdisciplinary research, advising, diversity, and leadership. This 120 credit, four year degree program offers "the opportunity to examine the human experience of military conflict throughout history and in diverse cultures while developing a strong foundation in research and written and verbal skills."

=== University of Missouri—St. Louis ===
The Department of Sociology at the University of Missouri—St. Louis has offered a Minor in Veterans Studies since 2014. Multidisciplinary coursework claims a “nuanced understanding of the military and veteran experience."

=== University of California, Irvine ===
Logo from UC Irvine

Since 2019 the School of Social Sciences at the University of California, Irvine has offered a three-course “multidisciplinary, undergraduate” certificate in veterans studies open to veterans and non-veteran students with an estimated completion of the certificate within two years. The three courses: Veterans in History and Society, Veterans’ Voices, and Veterans’ Transitions, promote the critical analysis of veterans’ diverse and complex experiences by investigating veterans and their multiple roles in US history and society. As of 2025, due to "extreme budget cuts" UCI has only been "able to offer their veterans studies courses during summer session."

=== University of Utah ===
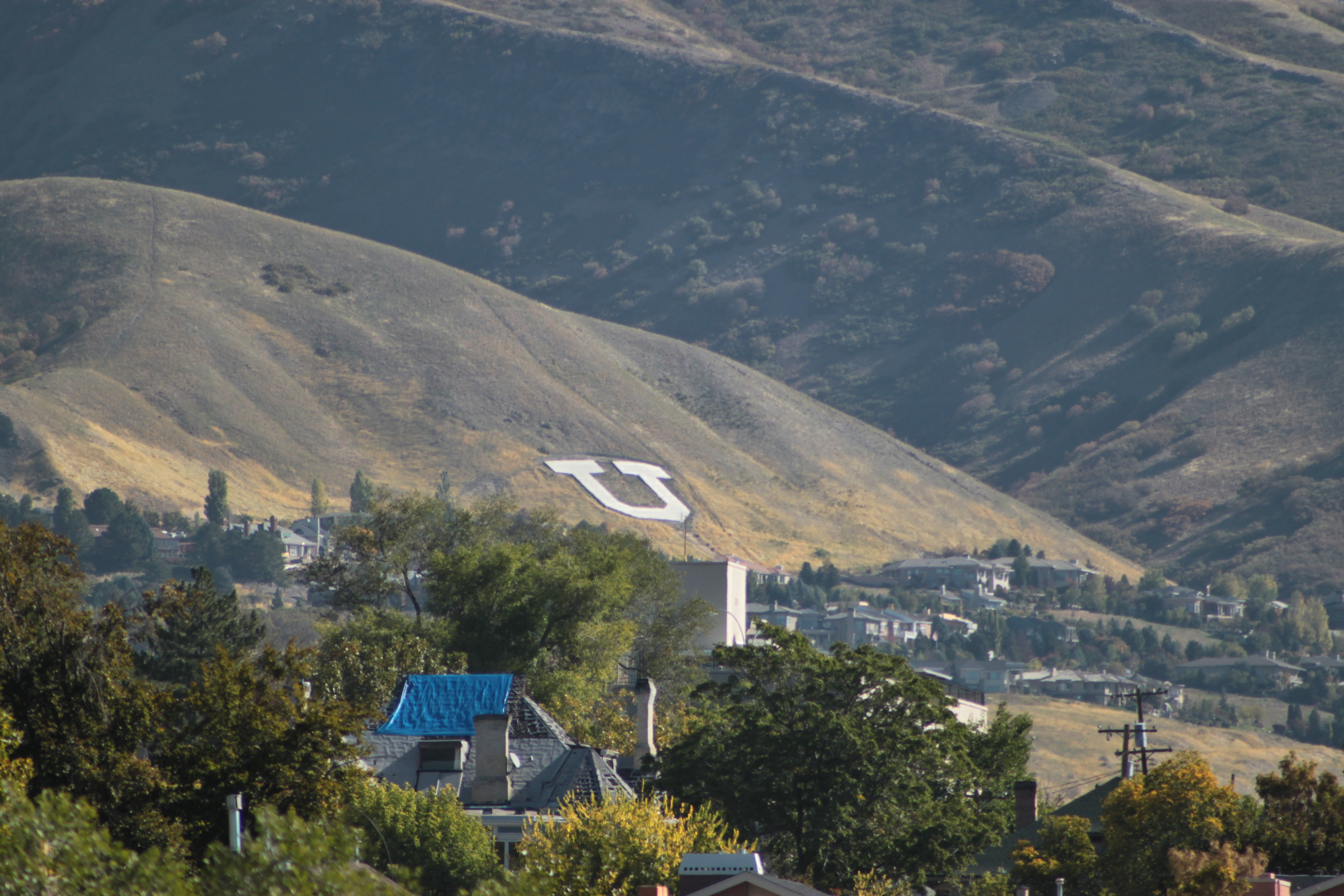
University of Utah campus from LDS Convention Center

The Office of Undergraduate Studies has offered a 24-credit Veterans Studies certificate since fall 2022. Intended for "undergraduates in any discipline" to "better serve or relate to veterans in our communities, workplaces, and care facilities." The certificate covers four themes: Government and national security, History of war and violent conflict, Social/ethical aspects of war, and Social and health topics relevant to veterans.

== Publications ==
=== Journal of Veterans Studies ===
The Journal of Veterans Studies (ISSN 2470-4768) is a diamond open access, international, interdisciplinary academic journal (ISSN 2470-4768). It was founded in November 2015 by Mariana Grohowski, PhD, and published its first issue in July 2016. The mission of the refereed journal is to support the scholarly investigation of military veterans' and their families’ experiences, specifically after the completion of their military service. The journal is supported by the Veterans Studies Association and Virginia Tech Publishing .

The journal maintains a diamond open access policy, believing that making research openly available promotes a mutual exchange of information. Not only is it free to read articles, it is free to publish/submit to the journal. Authors retain copyright and can grant third parties the right to use, replicate, and distribute the article based on the Creative Commons license agreement.

=== Journal of Military, Veteran, and Family Health ===
The Journal of Military, Veteran and Family Health (ISSN 2368-7924), founded in 2015, is a peer-reviewed, open access, scholarly journal published by the University of Toronto Press. Focusing on issues related to the "health and social well-being of military personnel, veterans, and their families," it is the official journal of the Canadian Institute for Military and Veteran Health Research (CIMVHR).

== Associations ==
=== Veterans Studies Association ===
The Veterans Studies Association supports the study of veterans in all aspects of their lives. VSA believes that the category of veteran should be evaluated based, not only on their status of veteran, but also their life experiences. The VSA does not only focus on American veterans but also veterans of other countries. Established in 2019 as a nonprofit, VSA is a membership-based association that supports the Journal of Veterans Studies and hosts the Veterans in Society Conference. The Veterans Studies Association has four committees. The first is the publications and scholarship committee, chaired by Christopher Rodriguez, the second is the social media & external engagement committee, chaired by Latosha Henderson, the third is the administration committee, chaired by Eric Fretz and Bryon Garner, and the last is the conference oversight committee, chaired by Corrine Hinton and Karla Seijas. The association is led by Interim President Bryon Garner, Secretary & Immediate Past President Jim Craig, Treasurer Micah Wright, and At-Large Members Carrie Carter, Eric Fretz, Latosha Henderson, and Karla Seijas. There are nine Advisory Board Members: Anita Casavantes Bradford, Eric Hodge, Mariana Grohowksi, Matt Porter, Bruce Pencek, Christopher Rodriguez, Steve Wahle, Wanda Wright, and Sharon Young.

=== Initiatives and Interest Groups ===
==== Veterans in Society Initiative ====
The Veterans in Society Initiative of Virginia Tech (ViS; also known as the Veterans Studies Group) began in 2013 by Bruce Pencek, PhD, and James Dubinsky, PhD. ViS is responsible for founding the Veterans in Society Conference, which is the field's flagship conference.

==== Writing with Current, Former, and Future Members of the Military Standing Group ====
"The Conference on College Composition and Communication (CCCC) has a number of Member Groups that hold meetings, sponsor panels and workshops at the Annual Convention, publish newsletters, and carry on other activities within the framework of the organization." CCCC recognizes both special interest groups and standing groups. What began in 2009 as a special interest group for writing studies faculty working with students at military service academies (as Special Interest Group Writing at the Service Academies formed by D. Alexis Hart, PhD), matured into the Standing Group Writing with Current, Former, and Future Members of the Military, but was downgraded back to a Special Interest Group due to low engagement in 2025. According to CCCC, "Standing Groups are membership-driven groups focused around a common interest that supports directly CCCC’s mission and bedrock beliefs." Select members of the group served on a CCCC Task Force on Student Veterans and developed the CCCC Position Statement (2015/2022) "Student Veterans in the College Composition Classroom: Realizing Their Strengths and Assessing Their Needs." The group has held full-day and half-day workshops for veterans studies scholars and been awarded CCCC outreach grants for community events with veterans service organizations in the cities where previous conventions were held.

== Conferences ==
=== Veterans in Society Conference ===
Established in 2013 by the Veterans in Society Initiative at Virginia Tech, the Veterans in Society Conference is held biannually. The location of the conference changes. The conference is primarily made up of scholarly panels, keynote speakers, and workshops.

==== Prior conferences ====
Date	Location	Theme
April 14–15, 2013	Virginia Tech | Blacksburg, VA	Changing the Discourse
April 27–28, 2014	Roanoke, VA	Humanizing the Discourse
November 12–14, 2015	Roanoke, VA	Race and/or Reconciliation
March 26–28, 2018	Roanoke, VA	Veterans Globalized
March 22–24, 2020	University of Missouri St. Louis | Scheduled for St. Louis, MO but canceled due to Coronavirus	Identity, Advocacy, Representation
May 21, 2021	Online	Conversations in Veterans Studies
October 20–21, 2022	Arizona State University | Phoenix, AZ	Resilience, Pedagogy, and Veterans Studies
March 14–15, 2024	University of South Carolina | Columbia, SC	Tidal Changes in the Sea of Goodwill
March 26–28, 2026	University of Chicago | Chicago, IL	Remembering and Forgetting
