= List of heliports in Canada =

This is an alphabetical list of heliports in Canada. It includes all Nav Canada certified and registered heliports in the provinces and territories of Canada.

They are listed in the format:

- Airport name as listed in the Canada Flight Supplement (CFS), ICAO code, community served, and province and coordinates.

The airport name in the CFS may differ from the name used by the airport authority.

Heliports as of 27 November 2025
Location	Number
Canada	430
Alberta	110
British Columbia	83
Manitoba	7
New Brunswick	5
Newfoundland and Labrador	6
Northwest Territories	5
Nova Scotia	21
Nunavut	0
Ontario	130
Prince Edward Island	2
Quebec	47
Saskatchewan	14
Yukon	0

Name	LID (Note: ICAO airport code / Transport Canada / IATA airport code)	Type PU PR MI	Operator	Elevation	Location	Province territory	Image	Coordinates
Abbotsford (Regional Hospital & Cancer Centre)	CAB5	PR	Abbotsford Regional Hospital and Cancer Centre	287 ft (87 m)	Abbotsford	British Columbia		49°02′10″N 122°18′51″W
Abbotsford (Sumas Mountain)	CSM7	PR	Hydra Helicopters	1,067 ft (325 m)	Abbotsford	British Columbia		49°06′18″N 122°11′51″W
Abbotsford (Teck)	CTK8	PR	Tecklenair Aciation	165 ft (50 m)	Abbotsford	British Columbia		49°07′37″N 122°23′41″W
Airdrie/Waldhof	CAW3	PR	Don Bell	3,690 ft (1,120 m)	Airdrie	Alberta		51°15′18″N 114°04′25″W
Ajax-Pickering General Hospital	CPE2	PR	Lakeridge Health	301 ft (92 m)	Ajax	Ontario		43°50′09″N 79°01′03″W
Alliston	CPJ2	PR	USCAN Aviation Sales	760 ft (230 m)	Alliston	Ontario		44°08′54″N 79°48′03″W
Alliston (Stevenson Memorial Hospital)	CPZ2	PR	Stevenson Memorial Hospital	750 ft (230 m)	Alliston	Ontario		44°09′19″N 79°52′27″W
Almonte (General Hospital)	CAL5	PR	Almonte General Hospital	440 ft (130 m)	Almonte	Ontario		45°13′49″N 76°11′14″W
Antigonish (St. Martha's Regional Hospital)	CDY5	PR	St. Martha's Regional Hospital	70 ft (21 m)	Antigonish	Nova Scotia		45°37′36″N 61°58′55″W
Antler Valley Farm	CAV2	PR	Antler Valley Farm	3,040 ft (930 m)	Red Deer County	Alberta		52°05′14″N 113°51′00″W
Anzac (Long Lake)	CNZ2	PR	Nexen Energy	1,612 ft (491 m)	Athabasca oil sands	Alberta		56°25′27″N 110°57′52″W
Arichat (St. Anne Ladies Auxiliary Hospital)	CDT3	PR	St. Anne Ladies Auxiliary	70 ft (21 m)	Arichat	Nova Scotia		45°30′41″N 61°02′01″W
Atikokan (General Hospital)	CKF3	PR	Atikokan General Hospital	1,285 ft (392 m)	Atikokan	Ontario		48°45′17″N 91°35′48″W
Bancroft (North Hastings District Hospital)	CPB7	PR	Quinte Health Care	1,085 ft (331 m)	Bancroft	Ontario		45°04′17″N 77°52′44″W
Banff Mineral Springs (Hospital)	CBM7	PR	Alberta Health Services - Mineral Springs Hospital	4,540 ft (1,380 m)	Banff	Alberta		51°10′47″N 115°34′34″W
Banff (Park Compound)	CBP2	PR	Banff Park Warden Service	4,570 ft (1,390 m)	Banff	Alberta		51°11′30″N 115°33′30″W
Barrhead (Healthcare Centre)	CHC3	PR	Barrhead Healthcare Centre	2,116 ft (645 m)	Barrhead	Alberta		54°07′06″N 114°24′01″W
Barrie (Royal Victoria Hospital)	CRV2	PR	Royal Victoria Regional Health Centre	855 ft (261 m)	Barrie	Ontario		44°24′52″N 79°39′57″W
Barry's Bay (St. Francis Memorial Hospital)	CPV6	PR	St. Francis Memorial Hospital	1,000 ft (300 m)	Barry's Bay	Ontario		45°28′55″N 77°41′44″W
Bassano (Health Centre)	CBL4	PR	Bassano Health Centre	2,606 ft (794 m)	Bassano	Alberta		50°47′26″N 112°27′39″W
Beardmore (Health Centre)	CPY3	PR	Municipality of Greenstone	1,015 ft (309 m)	Beardmore	Ontario		49°36′29″N 87°57′18″W
Bécancour	CSV3	PR	Société du Parc Industriel et Portuair de Bécancour	31 ft (9.4 m)	Bécancour	Quebec		46°21′52″N 72°23′44″W
Beddis Beach	CBB4	PR	Pat and Rosemarie Keough	171 ft (52 m)	Beddis Beach	British Columbia		48°48′00″N 123°25′25″W
Belleville (QHC)	CBV5	PU	Quinte Health Care	277 ft (84 m)	Belleville	Ontario		44°10′02″N 77°21′01″W
Black Diamond (Oilfields General Hospital)	CFL3	PR	Alberta Health Services	3,924 ft (1,196 m)	Black Diamond	Alberta		50°40′39″N 114°14′05″W
Blackie/McElroy Ranch	CMC5	PR	Tyler McElroy	3,415 ft (1,041 m)	Blackie	Alberta		50°37′52″N 113°35′30″W
Blairmore (Crowsnest Pass Hospital)	CBS9	PR	Alberta Health Services	4,292 ft (1,308 m)	Blairmore	Alberta		49°36′58″N 114°27′26″W
Bolton	CNB2	PR	National Helicopter	700 ft (210 m)	Bolton	Ontario		43°51′08″N 79°41′41″W
Bonadventure (H. Stever)	CBS3	PR	Harvey Stever	52 ft (16 m)	Bonaventure	Quebec		48°03′04″N 65°26′48″W
Bonnyville Health Centre	CBN2	PR	Bonnyville Health Centre	1,825 ft (556 m)	Bonnyville	Alberta		54°15′50″N 110°44′25″W
Borden (CFB Borden)	CYBN / YBN	MI	DND	729 ft (222 m)	CFB Borden	Ontario		44°16′18″N 79°54′45″W
Bowmanville Haines St. Hospital	CLH8	PR	Lakeridge Health	290 ft (88 m)	Bowmanville	Ontario		43°54′23″N 78°39′50″W
Bracebridge (South Muskoka Memorial Hospital)	CPL2	PR	South Muskoka Memorial Hospital	870 ft (270 m)	Bracebridge	Ontario		45°02′55″N 79°18′55″W
Brampton (National "D")	CPC4	PR	National Helicopter	780 ft (240 m)	Brampton	Ontario		43°50′00″N 79°42′03″W
Bridgewater (South Shore Regional Hospital)	CDT6	PR	Nova Scotia Health Authority	100 ft (30 m)	Bridgewater	Nova Scotia		44°22′56″N 64°30′38″W
Brooks (Community Health Centre)	CFV8	PR	Brooks Community Health Centre	2,498 ft (761 m)	Brooks	Alberta		50°34′07″N 111°53′18″W
Buffalo Narrows (Fire Centre)	CBN3	PR	Saskatchewan Ministry of Environment Fire Management & Forest Protection	1,411 ft (430 m)	Buffalo Narrows	Saskatchewan		55°50′03″N 108°24′15″W
Calgary (Aerial Recon)	CAR3	PR	Eric Gould	3,820 ft (1,160 m)	Calgary	Alberta		50°52′05″N 114°08′17″W
Calgary (Alberta Children's Hospital)	CAC6	PR	Alberta Health Services	3,670 ft (1,120 m)	Calgary	Alberta		51°04′33″N 114°08′52″W
Calgary/Blue Con	CBC6	PR	Matt Haasen	3,440 ft (1,050 m)	Calgary	Alberta		50°59′49″N 113°53′38″W
Calgary (Bow Crow)	CEP2	PR	Sustainable Resource Development, Forest Protection Division	3,540 ft (1,080 m)	Calgary	Alberta		51°06′11″N 114°12′54″W
Calgary/Eastlake	CEL9	PR	Al Morrison	3,418 ft (1,042 m)	Calgary	Alberta		50°57′18″N 113°58′22″W
Calgary/Elephant Enterprises Inc.	CEE2	PR	Elephant Enterprises	3,596 ft (1,096 m)	Calgary	Alberta		51°06′55″N 114°17′44″W
Calgary (Foothills Hospital McCaig Tower)	CMT3	PR	Alberta Health Services	3,765 ft (1,148 m)	Calgary	Alberta		51°03′55″N 114°08′06″W
Calgary/K. Coffey Residence	CKC4	PR	Ken Coffey	4,204 ft (1,281 m)	Calgary	Alberta		51°09′56″N 114°18′52″W
Calgary/Okotoks (GG Ranch)	COK2	PR	Brian Van Humbeck	3,622 ft (1,104 m)	Okotoks	Alberta		50°44′41″N 113°59′30″W
Calgary (Peter Lougheed Centre)	CLC3	PR	Alberta Health Services	3,684 ft (1,123 m)	Calgary	Alberta		51°04′46″N 113°58′58″W
Calgary (Rockyview Hospital)	CEM2	PR	Alberta Health Services	3,590 ft (1,090 m)	Calgary	Alberta		50°59′18″N 114°05′54″W
Calgary (South Health Campus Hospital)	CSH3	PR	Alberta Health Services	3,486 ft (1,063 m)	Calgary	Alberta		50°52′58″N 113°57′07″W
Campbell River (Campbell River & District Hospital)	CAT6	PR	Island Health	282 ft (86 m)	Campbell River	British Columbia		50°00′31″N 125°14′34″W
Campbell River (Graham Air Limited)	CCR6	PR	Graham Air Limited	7 ft (2.1 m)	Campbell River	British Columbia		50°02′30″N 125°16′30″W
Campbell River (Sealand Aviation)	CSL4	PR	Sealand Aviation	357 ft (109 m)	Campbell River	British Columbia		49°57′03″N 125°15′51″W
Camrose/St. Mary's Hospital	CMR6	PR	FM&E Covenant Health	2,428 ft (740 m)	Camrose	Alberta		53°00′54″N 112°49′49″W
Canmore (Hospital)	CCH3	PR	Alberta Health Services	4,305 ft (1,312 m)	Camrose	Alberta		51°05′33″N 115°20′58″W
Canmore Municipal	CEW9	PU	Canmore (Alpine) Heliport	4,296 ft (1,309 m)	Canmore	Alberta		51°04′43″N 115°20′20″W
Canmore/Nakoda	CNK7	PU	Alpine Helicopters	4,260 ft (1,300 m)	Canmore	Alberta		51°06′12″N 115°00′44″W
Canso (Eastern Memorial Hospital)	CCE5	PR	Municipality of the District of Guysborough	19 ft (5.8 m)	Canso	Nova Scotia		45°19′58″N 60°58′53″W
Carway/Grizzly Creek Ranch	CGC4	PR	Mark Pilling	4,683 ft (1,427 m)	Carway	Alberta		49°00′16″N 113°30′19″W
Castlegar (Tarrys Convention Centre)	CCT3	PR	Tarrys Convention Centre	1,630 ft (500 m)	Castlegar	British Columbia		49°23′10″N 117°33′09″W
CFB Gagetown]]	CYCX / YCX	MI	DND	166 ft (51 m)	Oromocto	New Brunswick		45°50′16″N 66°26′12″W
CFB Suffield]]	CYSD / YSD	MI	Department of National Defence	2,525 ft (770 m)	Suffield	Alberta		50°16′0″N 111°11′0″W
Charlottetown (Queen Elizabeth Hospital)	CDV3	PR	Queen Elizabeth Hospital	20 ft (6.1 m)	Charlottetown	Prince Edward Islandd		46°15′20″N 63°05′56″W
Chatham-Kent Health Alliance (Chatham)	CPG8	PR	Chatham-Kent Health Alliance	593 ft (181 m)	Chatham-Kent	Ontario		42°24′13″N 82°11′36″W
Chibougamau	CSB4	PU	Hamel Multiservices	1,250 ft (380 m)	Chibougamau	Quebec		49°54′16″N 74°23′02″W
Chibougamau (Hydro-Québec)	CSE2	PR	Hydro-Québec	1,270 ft (390 m)	Chibougamau	Quebec		49°53′16″N 74°24′01″W
Chicoutimi (C. H. de Chicoutimi)	CCS7	PR	CIUSSS du Saguenay-Lac-St-Jean	198 ft (60 m)	Chicoutimi	Quebec		48°25′33″N 71°02′52″W
Churchill (Hudson Bay Helicopters)	CHB2	PR	Hudson Bay Helicopters	20 ft (6.1 m)	Churchill	Manitoba		58°45′59″N 94°10′04″W
Claresholm (General Hospital)	CFV7	PR	Alberta Health Services	3,383 ft (1,031 m)	Claresholm	Alberta		50°01′06″N 113°34′59″W
Cline River	CCR5	PR	Rockies Heli Tours Canada	4,386 ft (1,337 m)	Cline River	Alberta		52°10′44″N 116°28′45″W
Cobourg (Northumberland Hills Hospital)	CNB4	PR	Northumberland Hills Hospital	343 ft (105 m)	Cobourg	Ontario		43°58′38″N 78°12′00″W
Cold Lake Healthcare Centre	CCH9	PR	Alberta Health Services	1,706 ft (520 m)	Cold Lake	Alberta		54°29′06″N 110°11′44″W
Collingwood/Alta	CWD2	PR	Four Seasons Aviation; David Tommasini	725 ft (221 m)	Collingwood	Ontario		44°31′46″N 80°21′15″W
Collingwood (Blue Mountain)	CBM4	PR	Craigleith Meadows	735 ft (224 m)	Collingwood	Ontario		44°31′47″N 80°21′17″W
Collingwood (General and Marine Hospital)	CPP2	PR	Collingwood General and Marine Hospital	600 ft (180 m)	Collingwood	Ontario		44°29′59″N 80°12′12″W
Collingwood/Mountain Road	CMR4	PR	Big Blue Air	735 ft (224 m)	Collingwood	Ontario		44°29′42″N 80°17′33″W
Collingwood (Wilsons)	CCW2	PR	Richard Wilson	592 ft (180 m)	Collingwood	Ontario		44°30′35″N 80°13′46″W
Comox Valley Hospital	CBV8	PR	Island Health	357 ft (109 m)	Comox	British Columbia		49°42′44″N 124°58′10″W
Consort (Health Centre)	CCS2	PR	FM&E AHS	2,445 ft (745 m)	Consort	Alberta		52°00′33″N 110°46′55″W
Cornwall (Community Hospital McConnell Site)	CPS6	PR	Cornwall Community Hospital McConnell Site	230 ft (70 m)	Cornwall	Ontario		45°01′52″N 74°43′04″W
Cornwall (DEV Centre)	CNC2	PR	DEV Centre – DEV Hotel and Conference Centre	185 ft (56 m)	Cornwall	Ontario		45°01′39″N 74°40′47″W
Coronation (Health Centre)	CRH2	PR	FM&E AHS	2,618 ft (798 m)	Coronation	Alberta		52°05′46″N 111°27′34″W
Cortes Island	CBL7	PR	Cortes Island Fire Department	230 ft (70 m)	Cortes Island	British Columbia		50°03′31″N 124°58′54″W
Cranbrook (East Kootenay Regional Hospital)	CAE2	PR	Interior Health Authority	3,061 ft (933 m)	Cranbrook	British Columbia		49°30′42″N 115°44′59″W
Daysland Health Centre	CDL3	PR	Alberta Health Services	2,318 ft (707 m)	Daysland	Alberta		52°52′08″N 112°16′22″W
DeBolt Fire Hall	CDB2	PR	Municipal District of Greenview No. 16	2,093 ft (638 m)	DeBolt	Alberta		55°13′00″N 118°01′46″W
Delburne/Hall Residence	CDB3	PR	Dean Hall	2,769 ft (844 m)	Delburne	Alberta		52°14′11″N 113°24′32″W
De Winton (Hamlet)	CDW3	PR	Mike Holcroft	3,593 ft (1,095 m)	De Winton	Alberta		50°49′35″N 114°01′26″W
De Winton (Highwood)	CED6	PR	2124068 Alberta	3,435 ft (1,047 m)	De Winton	Alberta		50°48′11″N 113°53′34″W
Didsbury District Health Services	CDD7	PR	Alberta Health Services	3,374 ft (1,028 m)	Didsbury	Alberta		51°39′42″N 114°07′22″W
Digby (General Hospital)	CDG2	PR	Nova Scotia Health Authority	142 ft (43 m)	Digby	Nova Scotia		44°36′57″N 65°45′43″W
Dolbeau-Mistassini/Potvin Heli-Base	CPH4	PR	R. Potvin	425 ft (130 m)	Dolbeau-Mistassini	Quebec		48°55′51″N 72°12′18″W
Drayton Valley (Hospital & Care Centre)	CFV9	PR	Alberta Health Services	2,882 ft (878 m)	Drayton Valley	Alberta		53°12′44″N 114°58′15″W
Drumheller (Health Centre)	CDH2	PR	Alberta Health Services	2,246 ft (685 m)	Drumheller	Alberta		51°28′09″N 112°43′42″W
Dryden Best Western	CKV3	PR	Best Western Motor Inn	1,200 ft (370 m)	Dryden	Ontario		49°47′00″N 92°50′00″W
Duncan (Cowichan District Hospital)	CDH4	PR	Island Health	131 ft (40 m)	Duncan	British Columbia		48°47′10″N 123°43′17″W
Dundas	CDU2	PR	Robert D. Sheppard	680 ft (210 m)	Dundas	Ontario		43°14′44″N 80°01′06″W
Dunnville (Haldimand War Memorial Hospital)	CPA9	PR	Haldimand War Memorial Hospital	586 ft (179 m)	Dunnville	Ontario		42°54′49″N 79°37′43″W
Dunsford	CDU8	PR	Cecil Shaw	854 ft (260 m)	Dunsford	Ontario		44°30′07″N 78°37′04″W
Durham (Memorial Hospital)	CPD3	PR	Durham Memorial Hospital	1,125 ft (343 m)	Durham	Ontario		44°10′45″N 80°49′46″W
Earlton/McLean	CCM2	PR	McLean’s Farm	900 ft (270 m)	Earlton	Ontario		47°39′12″N 79°55′34″W
Edmonton/Bailey	CBY2	PR	Dan Jacobs	2,392 ft (729 m)	Sherwood Park	Alberta		53°30′28″N 113°14′11″W
Edmonton (City)	CCE7	PR	City of Edmonton	2,254 ft (687 m)	Edmonton	Alberta		53°22′09″N 113°39′49″W
Edmonton/Eastport	CEP8	PR	Carol Mulkay	2,367 ft (721 m)	Sherwood Park	Alberta		53°30′18″N 113°19′56″W
Edmonton/Grey Nuns Community Hospital	CES8	PR	Covenant Health	2,274 ft (693 m)	Edmonton	Alberta		53°27′44″N 113°25′40″W
Edmonton/Kelsonae	CSG6	PR	Sunwapta Helicopters	2,325 ft (709 m)	Edmonton	Alberta		53°21′58″N 113°50′16″W
Edmonton/Misericordia (Community Hospital)	CMC2	PR	Covenant Health	2,215 ft (675 m)	Edmonton	Alberta		53°31′13″N 113°36′40″W
Edmonton/Namao (CFB Edmonton)	CYED / YED	MI	408 OPS Department of National Defence	2,257 ft (688 m)	Edmonton	Alberta		53°40′09″N 113°28′32″W
Edmonton (Royal Alexandra Hospital)	CFH7	PU	Royal Alexandra Hospital	2,254 ft (687 m)	Edmonton	Alberta		53°33′28″N 113°29′47″W
Edmonton/St. Albert (Delta Helicopters)	CES3	PR	Delta Helicopters	2,265 ft (690 m)	St. Albert	Alberta		53°41′12″N 113°41′14″W
Edmonton/Sturgeon Community Hospital	CSA3	PR	Alberta Health Services	2,250 ft (690 m)	Edmonton	Alberta		53°39′17″N 113°37′38″W
Edmonton/University of Alberta (Stollery Children's Hospital)	CEW7	PR	Alberta Health Services	2,367 ft (721 m)	Edmonton	Alberta		53°31′13″N 113°31′19″W
Elkford	CEH7	PR	District of Elkford	4,298 ft (1,310 m)	Elkford	British Columbia		50°00′25″N 114°55′23″W
Elk Point (Healthcare Centre)	CEP7	PR	Alberta Health Services	1,980 ft (600 m)	Elk Point	Alberta		53°53′54″N 110°54′29″W
Englehart (District Hospital)	CNS3	PR	Englehart and District Hospital	679 ft (207 m)	Englehart	Ontario		47°49′23″N 79°52′49″W
Estevan (St. Josephs's Hospital)	CSJ3	PR	Sun County Health Region	1,878 ft (572 m)	Estevan	Saskatchewan		49°09′11″N 103°00′47″W
Fergus (Groves Memorial Community Hospital)	CPB2	PR	Groves Memorial Community Hospital	1,366 ft (416 m)	Fergus	Ontario		43°41′51″N 80°23′42″W
Fermont	CSD5	PR	Heli Fermont Enr.	2,009 ft (612 m)	Fermont	Quebec		52°48′22″N 67°06′08″W
Fernie (Elk Valley Hospital)	CBP3	PR	Interior Health District	3,299 ft (1,006 m)	Fernie	British Columbia		49°30′46″N 115°03′22″W
Fort Erie (Airbus Helicopters Canada Ltd)	CPG3	PR	Airbus Helicopters Canada Ltd	625 ft (191 m)	Fort Erie	Ontario		42°55′16″N 78°57′21″W
Fort Macleod (Hospital)	CFM9	PR	Alberta Health Services	3,095 ft (943 m)	Fort Macleod	Alberta		49°43′32″N 113°23′32″W
Fort McMurray/Northern Lights Regional Health Centre	CNO9	PR	Alberta Health Services	850 ft (260 m)	Fort McMurray	Alberta		56°43′01″N 111°21′35″W
Fort Qu'Appelle (All Nations Healing Hospital)	CFQ2	PR	Treaty Four Holding Corp All Nations Healing Hospital	1,581 ft (482 m)	Fort Qu'Appelle	Saskatchewan		50°45′38″N 103°47′08″W
Fort St. James (Stuart Lake Hospital)	CFJ2	PR	Stuart Lake Hospital Maintenance	2,362 ft (720 m)	Fort St. James	British Columbia		54°26′27″N 124°14′33″W
Fort Saskatchewan (Community Hospital)	CSV4	PR	Alberta Health Services	2,055 ft (626 m)	Fort Saskatchewan	Alberta		53°41′35″N 113°12′37″W
Fort Simpson (Great Slave No. 1)	CFS2	PR	Govt of Northwest Territories	500 ft (150 m)	Fort Simpson	Northwest Territories		61°50′18″N 121°19′35″W
Fort Simpson (Great Slave No. 2)	CFD8	PR	Govt of Northwest Territories	48 ft (15 m)	Fort Simpson	Northwest Territories		61°50′12″N 121°19′30″W
Fort Smith (District)	CEC5	PR	Department of Environment & Climate Change, Govt of Northwest Territories	665 ft (203 m)	Fort Smith	Northwest Territories		60°00′11″N 111°54′34″W
Fort Vermilion/Country Gardens B&B	CKV9	PU	Daryl & Marg Zielsdorf	915 ft (279 m)	Fort Vermilion	Alberta		58°21′02″N 115°56′57″W
Frank Channel (Forestry)	CFB2	PR	Department of Environment & Climate Change, Govt of Northwest Territories	520 ft (160 m)	Frank Channel	Northwest Territories		62°47′10″N 115°56′45″W
Fredericton (RCMP)	CRC2	PR	Royal Canadian Mounted Police	369 ft (112 m)	Fredericton	New Brunswick		45°55′54″N 66°40′00″W
Galore Creek	CGC2	PR	Galore Creek Mining Corporation	2,601 ft (793 m)	Galore Creek mine	British Columbia		57°07′24″N 131°27′09″W
Gander (James Paton Memorial Regional Health Centre)	CGH2	PR	James Paton Memorial Regional Health Centre	432 ft (132 m)	Gander	Newfoundland and Labrador		48°57′19″N 54°37′38″W
Ganges (Lady Minto/Gulf Islands Hospital)	CAL7	PR	Island Health	148 ft (45 m)	Ganges	British Columbia		48°51′45″N 123°30′31″W
Ganonoque	CGN4	PR	Kouri’s Helicopters	297 ft (91 m)	Gananoque	Ontario		44°20′49″N 76°10′28″W
Ganonoque/Signature Stables	CGS3	PR	Luc Pilon	265 ft (81 m)	Gananoque	Ontario		44°18′50″N 76°13′50″W
Georgetown (Georgetown & District Hospital)	CNZ6	PR	Georgetown & District Hospital	878 ft (268 m)	Georgetown	Ontario		43°38′40″N 79°56′04″W
Geraldton (District Hospital)	CPJ4	PR	Geraldton District Hospital	1,101 ft (336 m)	Geraldton	Ontario		49°43′26″N 86°57′25″W
Golden (Golden & District General Hospital)	CBT5	PR	Golden & District General Hospital	2,585 ft (788 m)	Golden	British Columbia		51°17′49″N 116°58′01″W
Gold River (49 North Helicopters)	CGR2	PR	49 North Helicopters	182 ft (55 m)	Gold River	British Columbia		49°45′11″N 126°03′19″W
Gold River (The Ridge)	CGR4	PR	The Ridge Neighbourhood Pub	480 ft (150 m)	Gold River	British Columbia		49°47′00″N 126°02′37″W
Granby/Artopex Plus	CTR4	PR	Groupe Pro Plus	293 ft (89 m)	Granby	Quebec		45°23′27″N 72°45′58″W
Grande Cache (Community Health Complex)	CGC3	PR	Environment and Sustainable Resource Development	4,136 ft (1,261 m)	Grande Cache	Alberta		53°53′28″N 119°07′08″W
Grande Prairie Regional Hospital	CGP4	PR	Grande Prairie Regional Hospital	2,180 ft (660 m)	Grande Prairie	Alberta		55°10′34″N 118°47′16″W
Grand Falls-Windsor	CFW8	PU	Town of Grand Falls-Windsor	157 ft (48 m)	Grand Falls-Windsor	Newfoundland and Labrador		48°55′29″N 55°38′50″W
Grand Forks (Boundary Hospital)	CGF4	PR	Boundary Hospital	1,741 ft (531 m)	Grand Forks	British Columbia		49°01′50″N 118°28′12″W
Grovedale Fire Hall	CGR8	PR	Municipal District of Greenview No. 16	2,182 ft (665 m)	Grovedale	Alberta		55°01′18″N 118°51′43″W
Gun Lake	CGL5	PR	Blackcomb Aviation	2,950 ft (900 m)	Gun Lakes	British Columbia		50°53′23″N 122°50′48″W
Hagersville (West Haldimand General Hospital)	CPA6	PR	Hagersville West Haldimand General Hospital	729 ft (222 m)	Hagersville	Ontario		42°57′30″N 80°02′36″W
Haliburton (Hospital)	CNF2	PR	Haliburton Hospital	1,050 ft (320 m)	Haliburton	Ontario		45°02′17″N 78°31′49″W
Halifax (IWK Health Centre)	CIW2	PR	IWK Health Centre	223 ft (68 m)	Halifax	Nova Scotia		44°38′13″N 63°35′04″W
Halifax (QE II Health Sciences Centre)	CHQE	PR	Queen Elizabeth II Health Sciences Centre	260 ft (79 m)	Halifax	Nova Scotia		44°38′45″N 63°35′12″W
Halifax (South End)	CHS7	PR	Halifax Port Authority	13 ft (4.0 m)	Halifax	Nova Scotia		44°37′32″N 63°33′48″W
Hamilton (General Hospital)	CPK3	PR	Hamilton General Hospital	403 ft (123 m)	Hamilton	Ontario		43°15′43″N 79°51′17″W
Hamilton (McMaster University Medical Centre)	CPJ3	PR	Hamilton Health Sciences	265 ft (81 m)	Hamilton	Ontario		43°16′00″N 79°56′00″W
Hamilton/Waterdown	CWD3	PR	Highway 6 Heliport	794 ft (242 m)	Waterdown	Ontario		43°19′27″N 79°56′09″W
Hanna (Health Centre)	CHD3	PR	Alberta Health Services	2,687 ft (819 m)	Hanna	Alberta		51°39′04″N 111°55′44″W
Hanover (District Hospital)	CNZ7	PR	Hanover District Hospital	935 ft (285 m)	Hanover	Ontario		44°08′27″N 81°01′45″W
Hardisty (Health Centre)	CHD2	PR	FM&E AHS	2,080 ft (630 m)	Hardisty	Alberta		52°40′08″N 111°18′25″W
Harrington Harbour	CTH5	PU	Transports Québec	93 ft (28 m)	Harrington Harbour	Quebec		50°29′51″N 59°28′53″W
Hay River (District)	CET5	PR	Department of Environment & Natural Resources, Govt of Northwest Territories	550 ft (170 m)	Hay River	Northwest Territories		60°47′04″N 115°49′33″W
Hespero/Safron Residence	CTS6	PR	Terry Safron	3,192 ft (973 m)	Hespero	Alberta		52°16′49″N 114°25′41″W
High Level (Monashee Helicopters)	CHL5	PR	Monashee Helicopters	1,060 ft (320 m)	High Level	Alberta		58°30′51″N 117°06′53″W
High River (Hospital)	CHR2	PR	Alberta Health Services	3,407 ft (1,038 m)	High River	Alberta		50°34′34″N 113°52′46″W
Huntsville (Memorial District Hospital)	CPC9	PR	Huntsville Memorial District Hospital	1,085 ft (331 m)	Huntsville	Ontario		45°20′25″N 79°12′23″W
Ignace (MBCHC)	CJN3	PR	Mary Bergland Community Health Centre	1,500 ft (460 m)	Ignace	Ontario		49°24′27″N 91°38′04″W
Île aux Oies	CIO2	PR	Les Hélicoptères Canadiens	3 ft (0.91 m)	Île aux Oies	Quebec		47°08′15″N 70°28′42″W
Innisfail (Hospital)	CSF2	PU	Town of Innisfail	3,138 ft (956 m)	Innisfail	Alberta		52°01′10″N 113°57′13″W
Invermere (District Hospital)	CIV2	PR	Interior Health Authority	2,766 ft (843 m)	Invermere	British Columbia		50°30′26″N 116°01′57″W
Inverness (Consolidated Memorial Hospital)	CNV2	PR	Cape Breton District Health Authority	100 ft (30 m)	Inverness	Nova Scotia		46°11′58″N 61°17′29″W
Kamloops (Royal Inland Hospital)	CBC4	PR	Interior Health Authority	1,453 ft (443 m)	Kamloops	British Columbia		50°40′09″N 120°19′59″W
Kananaskis Village Helistop	CFE7	PU	Alberta Environment & Sustainable Development - Parks Division, Kananaskis Region	5,027 ft (1,532 m)	Kananaskis Village	Alberta		50°55′22″N 115°08′37″W
Kelowna (Alpine)	CAB7	PR	Alpine Helicopters	1,597 ft (487 m)	Kelowna	British Columbia		49°51′50″N 119°34′07″W
Kelowna (Argus)	CRG2	PR	Argus Properties	1,877 ft (572 m)	Kelowna	British Columbia		49°57′41″N 119°26′46″W
Kelowna (General Hospital)	CKH9	PR	Interior Health Authority	1,230 ft (370 m)	Kelowna	British Columbia		49°52′27″N 119°29′33″W
Kelowna/Ikon Adventures	CIA2	PR	Ikon Adventures	1,122 ft (342 m)	Kelowna	British Columbia		49°52′51″N 119°31′21″W
Kelowna (Valhalla)	CVA3	PR	Valhalla Helicopters	1,539 ft (469 m)	Kelowna	British Columbia		49°52′04″N 119°33′38″W
Kelowna (Wildcat Helicopters)	CWC2	PR	Wildcat Helicopters	1,640 ft (500 m)	Kelowna	British Columbia		49°52′03″N 119°34′45″W
Kemano	CBZ2	PR	Rio Tinto Alcan	160 ft (49 m)	Kemano	British Columbia		53°34′00″N 127°57′00″W
Kenora (Lake of The Woods District Hospital)	CJG6	PR	Kenora Lake of The Woods District Hospital	1,100 ft (340 m)	Kenora	Ontario		49°46′07″N 94°29′56″W
Kentville (Camp Aldershot)	CKM9	MI	DND	100 ft (30 m)	Kentville	Nova Scotia		45°05′39″N 64°30′32″W
Kentville (Valley Regional Hospital)	CKV8	PR	Valley Regional Hospital	80 ft (24 m)	Kentville	Nova Scotia		45°04′54″N 64°30′00″W
Kerrobert	CKR2	PR	Town of Kerrobert	2,275 ft (693 m)	Kerrobert	Saskatchewan		51°54′46″N 109°08′00″W
Kilbride (Bot)	CCB8	PR	Bot Engineering	895 ft (273 m)	Kilbride	Ontario		43°26′54″N 79°56′57″W
Killam (Health Centre)	CKH5	PR	FM&E Covenant Health	2,222 ft (677 m)	Killam	Alberta		52°47′15″N 111°51′35″W
Kincardine (South Bruce Grey Health Centre)	CPU2	PR	Kincardine South Bruce Grey Health Centre	7,000 ft (2,100 m)	Kincardine	Ontario		44°11′15″N 81°37′28″W
King City/Kingsbridge	CKC3	PR	The Kingsbridge Centre	932 ft (284 m)	King City	Ontario		43°55′01″N 79°33′22″W
Kingston (General Hospital)	CPJ7	PR	General Hospital	261 ft (80 m)	Kingston	Ontario		44°13′20″N 76°29′34″W
Lac-des-Écorces/Heliport Belle-Île	CDE2	PR	Excellence Aviation SB	802 ft (244 m)	Lac-des-Écorces	Quebec		46°31′30″N 75°23′7″W
Lacombe (Mustang Helicopters)	CMH3	PR	Mustang Helicopters	2,889 ft (881 m)	Blackfalds	Alberta		52°22′44″N 113°49′21″W
Lake Joseph/Burnt Island	CSD8	PR	Coywolf Aviation	742 ft (226 m)	Lake Joseph	Ontario		45°13′06″N 79°44′51″W
Lake Joseph/Eagle Island	CJE9	PR	Scott Dick/Tim Royes	830 ft (250 m)	Lake Joseph	Ontario		45°10′41″N 79°41′47″W
Lake Joseph/Scheinberg	CSH7	PR	Coywolf Aviation	742 ft (226 m)	Lake Joseph	Ontario		45°09′43″N 79°41′54″W
Lamont (Health Care Centre)	CLM4	PR	Alberta Health Services	2,124 ft (647 m)	Lamont	Alberta		53°45′49″N 112°45′15″W
La Ronge	CJX3	PR	Saskatchewan Ministry of Environment. Wildfire Management	1,225 ft (373 m)	La Ronge	Saskatchewan		55°06′53″N 105°17′43″W
Leslieville/W. Pidhirney Residence	CWP3	PR	Wayne Pidhirney	3,130 ft (950 m)	Leslieville	Alberta		52°21′33″N 114°34′17″W
Lethbridge (Chinook Regional Hospital)	CLH4	PR	Alberta Health Services	3,037 ft (926 m)	Lethbridge	Alberta		49°41′09″N 112°49′00″W
Lillooet (Blackcomb)	CBP5	PR	Blackcomb Helicopters	752 ft (229 m)	Lillooet	British Columbia		50°41′06″N 121°55′38″W
Little Current (Manitoulin Health Centre)	CNT4	PR	Manitoulin Health Centre	625 ft (191 m)	Little Current	Ontario		45°58′41″N 81°55′35″W
Little Parker Island	CBK9	PR	J. Bickerstaff	22 ft (6.7 m)	Little Parker Island	British Columbia		48°53′47″N 123°25′06″W
Liverpool (Queens General Hospital)	CLQ2	PR	Queens General Hospital	66 ft (20 m)	Liverpool	Nova Scotia		44°02′19″N 64°42′19″W
Lloydminster (Hospital)	CLH6	PR	Saskatchewan Health Authority	2,117 ft (645 m)	Lloydminster	Saskatchewan		53°16′26″N 109°59′21″W
London (University Hospital)	CPR4	PR	London University Hospital	794 ft (242 m)	London	Ontario		43°00′47″N 81°16′28″W
London (Victoria Hospital)	CPW2	PR	London Hospital Corporation	875 ft (267 m)	London	Ontario		42°57′33″N 81°13′32″W
Long Harbour River	CLH7	PR	Canadian Northern Outfitters	300 ft (91 m)	Long Harbour River	Newfoundland and Labrador		47°54′16″N 54°55′13″W
Long Pond	CCX2	PR	Cougar Helicopters	42 ft (13 m)	Foxtrap	Newfoundland and Labrador		47°30′59″N 52°58′52″W
Madrona Bay	CBW9	PR	I. Levin	35 ft (11 m)	Madrona	British Columbia		48°51′21″N 123°29′08″W
Magog/Aeria Helicentre	CMA3	PR	Aeria Hélicentre	652 ft (199 m)	Magog	Quebec		45°16′55″N 72°06′11″W
Magog/Lessard	CLS5	PR	Louis Lessard	682 ft (208 m)	Magog	Quebec		45°14′53″N 72°11′54″W
Manitouwadge (Santé/Health)	CPU4	PR	Santé Manitouwadge Health	1,052 ft (321 m)	Manitouwadge	Ontario		49°07′41″N 85°49′30″W
Marathon (Wilson Memorial Hospital)	CPX2	PR	North of Superior Healthcare Group -Wilson Memorial General Hospital	750 ft (230 m)	Marathon	Ontario		48°43′07″N 86°22′29″W
Markdale (Centre Grey General Hospital)	CPD9	PR	Centre Grey General Hospital	1,369 ft (417 m)	Markdale	Ontario		44°18′54″N 80°39′19″W
Mattawa (Hospital)	CMA5	PR	Mattawa Hospital	566 ft (173 m)	Mattawa	Ontario		46°18′36″N 78°42′46″W
Mayerthorpe (Healthcare Centre)	CMC3	PR	Mayerthorpe Healthcare Centre	2,351 ft (717 m)	Mayerthorpe	Alberta		53°56′56″N 115°07′59″W
Mayne Island (Medical Emergency)	CBF5	PR	Mayne Island Fire Department	100 ft (30 m)	Mayne Island	British Columbia		48°50′48″N 123°17′03″W
Meaford (Brightshores Health System)	CPA7	PR	Brightshores Health System	672 ft (205 m)	Meaford	Ontario		44°36′25″N 80°35′56″W
Medicine Hat (Regional Hospital)	CMH5	PR	Alberta Health Services	2,423 ft (739 m)	Medicine Hat	Alberta		50°02′07″N 110°42′07″W
Melfort (Hospital)	CMH7	PR	Melfort Hospital	1,514 ft (461 m)	Melfort	Saskatchewan		52°51′57″N 104°36′49″W
Middleton (Soldiers Memorial Hospital)	CMS2	PR	Soldiers Memorial Hospital	70 ft (21 m)	Middleton	Nova Scotia		44°56′46″N 65°03′32″W
Midland (Huronia District Hospital)	CPW6	PR	Huronia District Hospital	775 ft (236 m)	Midland	Ontario		44°44′30″N 79°54′52″W
Millgrove/Dragon’s Fire	CDF7	PR	Bells Hill Airpark	876 ft (267 m)	Millgrove	Ontario		43°22′50″N 79°56′27″W
Milton (AFI)	CMH2	PR	AFI Group International	687 ft (209 m)	Milton	Ontario		43°31′56″N 79°54′10″W
Milton (District Hospital)	CPY2	PR	Halton Health Care	663 ft (202 m)	Milton	Ontario		43°29′46″N 79°52′11″W
Mindemoya (Hospital)	CNW4	PR	Mindemoya Hospital	675 ft (206 m)	Mindemoya	Ontario		45°44′20″N 82°10′00″W
Minden (Hospital)	CMI2	PR	Haliburton Highlands Health Services	905 ft (276 m)	Minden Hills	Ontario		44°55′29″N 78°43′46″W
Moncton/Sailsbury	CDB5	PU	Irving Oil	230 ft (70 m)	Moncton	New Brunswick		46°02′58″N 65°03′45″W
Mono/Dunby Manor	CDM4	PR	James D. Wilson	1,407 ft (429 m)	Mono	Ontario		44°00′20″N 80°03′25″W
Mont-Tremblant/Heliport P3	CHP3	PR	Héli-Tremblant	915 ft (279 m)	Mont-Tremblant	Quebec		46°11′43″N 74°34′16″W
Mont-Tremblant/Saint-Jovite Héli-Tremblant	CHT3	PR	Héli-Tremblant	803 ft (245 m)	Saint-Jovite	Quebec		46°06′52″N 74°32′31″W
Montréal (Bell)	CSW5	PR	Bell Helicopter Textron	221 ft (67 m)	Montreal	Quebec		45°41′06″N 73°55′52″W
Montréal East (AIM)	CSH9	PR	American Iron & Metal GP	179 ft (55 m)	Montreal	Quebec		45°38′09″N 73°33′44″W
Montréal/Heliport Senneville	CHS5	PR	Richard Touchette	98 ft (30 m)	Montreal	Quebec		45°26′34″N 73°57′38″W
Montréal/Kruger	CSN2	PR	Kruger	195 ft (59 m)	Montreal	Quebec		45°30′25″N 73°38′09″W
Montréal/Les Cèdres	CSH6	PR	Canadian Helicopters	160 ft (49 m)	Les Cèdres	Quebec		45°20′52″N 74°05′07″W
Montréal/Met (Aéroport Métropolitain de Montéal) Heli-Inter	CTG2	PR	Heli-Inter	96 ft (29 m)	Longueuil	Quebec		45°31′54″N 73°24′43″W
Montréal/Mirabel Hélico	CMH4	PR	Mirabel Hélico	230 ft (70 m)	Montreal	Quebec		45°41′44″N 73°57′09″W
Montréal/Passport Hélico	CPP8	PR	Passport Hélico	75 ft (23 m)	Montreal	Quebec		45°43′21″N 73°35′43″W
Montréal/Point Zero	CPZ6	PR	Point Zero	152 ft (46 m)	Montreal	Quebec		45°31′47″N 73°39′27″W
Montreal River Harbour/Bluearth Bow Lake Windfarm	CBL5	PR	BluEarth Asset Management	1,012 ft (308 m)	Montreal River	Ontario		47°14′33″N 84°32′33″W
Montréal (Sacre-Coeur)	CSZ8	PR	Sacre-Coeur Hospital	84 ft (26 m)	Montreal	Quebec		45°31′59″N 73°42′45″W
Moose Factory	CPN3	PR	Moose Factory Hospital	40 ft (12 m)	Moose Factory	Ontario		51°14′57″N 80°37′02″W
Moose Jaw (Dr. F. H. Wigmore Regional Hospital)	CWH6	PR	Dr. F. H. Wigmore Regional Hospital	1,879 ft (573 m)	Moose Jaw	Saskatchewan		50°25′12″N 105°31′32″W
Mount Belcher	CMBH	PR	Don Arney	1,000 ft (300 m)	Mount Belcher	British Columbia		48°49′58″N 123°30′19″W
Mount Forest (Louise Marshall Hospital)	CPA2	PR	Mount Forest (Louise Marshall Hospital)	1,365 ft (416 m)	Mount Forest	Ontario		43°58′27″N 80°44′15″W
Mount Hope (Willow Valley)	CMH8	PR	Willow Valley Golf Course	723 ft (220 m)	Mount Hope	Ontario		43°09′53″N 79°53′50″W
Nakusp (Arrow Lakes Hospital)	CAL2	PR	Interior Health Authority	1,515 ft (462 m)	Nakusp	British Columbia		50°14′18″N 117°47′43″W
Nanaimo Boat Harbour	CMM3	PR	Mike Moore	180 ft (55 m)	Nanaimo	British Columbia		49°11′09″N 123°58′18″W
Nanaimo/Gabriola Island (Health Clinic)	CGB4	PR	Gabriola Health Care Foundation (Gabriola Fire Department)	321 ft (98 m)	Nanaimo	British Columbia		49°10′42″N 123°50′07″W
Nanaimo Harbour	CDH5	PR	Pacific Heliport Services	12 ft (3.7 m)	Nanaimo	British Columbia		49°09′39″N 123°55′24″W
Nanaimo (Regional Hospital)	CBG5	PR	Island Health	293 ft (89 m)	Nanaimo	British Columbia		49°11′09″N 123°58′18″W
Naramata	CNM6	PR	Finnair	1,872 ft (571 m)	Naramata	British Columbia		49°36′10″N 119°34′43″W
Nelson/Blaylock Estate	CYB3	PR	Brent Ironside	1,830 ft (560 m)	Nelson	British Columbia		49°32′41″N 117°15′38″W
Nelson (High Terrain Helicopters)	CHT4	PR	High Terrain Helicopters	1,950 ft (590 m)	Nelson	British Columbia		49°29′12″N 117°19′38″W
New Denver/Slocan Community (Health Centre)	CND7	PR	Interior Health Authority	1,770 ft (540 m)	New Denver	British Columbia		49°59′03″N 117°22′28″W
New Glasgow (Aberdeen Hospital)	CNG2	PR	Aberdeen Hospital	77 ft (23 m)	New Glasgow	Nova Scotia		45°34′20″N 62°38′39″W
New Liskeard (Temiskaming Hospital)	CNV3	PR	Temiskaming Hospital	895 ft (273 m)	New Liskeard	Ontario		47°29′40″N 79°41′30″W
Niagara Falls	CPQ3	PR	Niagara Helicopters	589 ft (180 m)	Niagara Falls	Ontario		43°07′09″N 79°04′31″W
Niagara Falls (Greater Niagara General Hospital)	CNG8	PR	Niagara Health System	650 ft (200 m)	Niagara Falls	Ontario		43°06′21″N 79°05′31″W
Nicolet	CSK9	MI	DND Range Controller	33 ft (10 m)	Nicolet	Quebec		46°13′13″N 72°38′52″W
Nipawin Hospital	CNH3	PR	Saskatchewan Health Authority	1,221 ft (372 m)	Nipawin	Saskatchewan		53°21′17″N 104°00′12″W
Nipigon (District Memorial Hospital)	CKE9	PR	Nipigon District Memorial Hospital	761 ft (232 m)	Nipigon	Ontario		49°00′57″N 88°16′39″W
Nordegg/Ahlstrom	CEG6	PU	Ahlstrom Air	4,411 ft (1,344 m)	Nordegg	Alberta		52°29′29″N 116°03′06″W
North Bay (North Bay Regional Health Centre)	CNB3	PR	North Bay Regional Health Centre	715 ft (218 m)	North Bay	Ontario		46°20′05″N 79°29′45″W
Oakville (Trafalgar Memorial Hospital)	CTM9	PR	Halton Health Care	531 ft (162 m)	Oakville	Ontario		43°26′56″N 79°45′49″W
Olds (Hospital)	CFU9	PR	Alberta Health Services	3,390 ft (1,030 m)	Olds / Didsbury	Alberta		51°48′05″N 114°07′00″W
Orangeville (Headwaters Healthecare Centre)	CHW2	PR	Headwaters Healthecare Centre Orangeville	1,520 ft (460 m)	Orangeville	Ontario		43°55′12″N 80°04′32″W
Orillia (Ontario Provincial Police)	COP2	PR	Ontario Provincial Police Helicopter Operations	820 ft (250 m)	Orillia	Ontario		44°35′04″N 79°25′44″W
Ottawa (Children's Hospital)	CPK7	PR	Children's Hospital of Eastern Ontario	272 ft (83 m)	Ottawa	Ontario		45°24′04″N 75°39′01″W
Ottawa (Civic Hospital)	CPP7	PR	Ottawa Civic Hospital	265 ft (81 m)	Ottawa	Ontario		45°23′30″N 75°43′14″W
Ottawa/Dwyer Hill	CYDH	MI	DND	325 ft (99 m)	Ottawa	Ontario		45°07′50″N 75°56′54″W
Ottawa/Gatineau (Casino)	CTA9	PU	Casiloc Inc.	220 ft (67 m)	Gatineau	Quebec		45°26′48″N 75°43′36″W
Ottawa (Winchester District Memorial Hospital)	CWH4	PR	Winchester District Memorial Hospital	258 ft (79 m)	Winchester	Ontario		45°05′17″N 75°21′16″W
Owen Sound (Brightshores Health System)	CNK6	PR	Brightshores Health System	794 ft (242 m)	Owen Sound	Ontario		44°34′05″N 80°54′48″W
Palmerston (District Hospital)	CPA3	PR	Palmerston & District Hospital	1,300 ft (400 m)	Palmerston	Ontario		43°50′18″N 80°50′31″W
Parksville (Ascent Helicopters)	CAH5	PR	Ascent Helicopters	261 ft (80 m)	Parksville	British Columbia		49°18′42″N 124°22′13″W
Parry Sound Medical	CRS2	PR	Parry Sound District EMS	717 ft (219 m)	Parry Sound	Ontario		45°20′30″N 80°01′00″W
Pembroke (Regional Hospital)	CNG5	PR	Pembroke Regional Hospital	496 ft (151 m)	Pembroke	Ontario		45°48′55″N 77°06′28″W
Penticton Regional Hospital	CPH6	PR	Interior Health Authority	1,356 ft (413 m)	Penticton	British Columbia		49°28′54″N 119°34′34″W
Perth (Great War Memorial Hospital)	CNC9	PR	Great War Memorial Hospital	450 ft (140 m)	Perth	Ontario		44°54′25″N 76°15′13″W
Petawawa	CYWA / YWA	MI	DND	427 ft (130 m)	Petawawa	Ontario		45°57′01″N 77°19′09″W
Peterborough (Regional Health Centre)	CNU3	PR	Peterborough Regional Health Centre	738 ft (225 m)	Peterborough	Ontario		44°18′02″N 78°20′45″W
Pincher Creek (Hospital)	CPR8	PR	Alberta Health Services	3,754 ft (1,144 m)	Pincher Creek	Alberta		49°29′33″N 113°56′51″W
Ponoka (Hospital & Care Centre)	CHC4	PR	FM&E AHS	2,676 ft (816 m)	Ponoka	Alberta		52°41′07″N 113°35′22″W
Port-Menier (H. Stever)	CPM2	PR	Harvey Stever	223 ft (68 m)	Port-Menier	Quebec		49°50′48″N 64°06′12″W
Portage (District General Hospital)	CPO2	PR	Southern Health Portage District General Hospital	857 ft (261 m)	Portage la Prairie	Manitoba		49°57′59″N 98°16′56″W
Port Alberni/Sproat Lake Tanker Base	CBT9	PR	Couldon Flying Tankers	103 ft (31 m)	Port Alberni	British Columbia		49°17′24″N 124°56′42″W
Port Alberni (West Coast General Hospital)	CBK5	PR	Island Health	273 ft (83 m)	Port Alberni	British Columbia		49°14′56″N 124°46′59″W
Port Alice (Hospital)	CBB5	PR	Port Alice Hospital	50 ft (15 m)	Port Alice	British Columbia		50°25′36″N 127°29′13″W
Port Carling/Elarton Point	CPE3	PR	Capital Infrastructure Group	743 ft (226 m)	Port Carling	Ontario		45°08′08″N 79°38′30″W
Port Carling/Fig Air	CFA2	PR	Fig Air	748 ft (228 m)	Port Carling	Ontario		45°07′41″N 79°32′16″W
Port Carling/Horseshoe Island	CHS8	PR	Horseshoe Island - Horseshoe Middle	755 ft (230 m)	Port Carling	Ontario		45°05′09″N 79°32′52″W
Port Carling/W Shores	CPC8	PR	James D. Wilson	739 ft (225 m)	Port Carling	Ontario		45°03′47″N 79°34′48″W
Port Hardy (Hospital)	CBS5	PR	Island Health	137 ft (42 m)	Port Hardy	British Columbia		50°43′15″N 127°30′11″W
Port McNeill (Hospital)	CBM9	PR	Island Health	280 ft (85 m)	Port McNeill	British Columbia		50°34′54″N 127°04′01″W
Port Perry (Lakeridge Health)	CPX6	PR	Lakeridge Health Port Perry	875 ft (267 m)	Port Perry	Ontario		44°06′19″N 78°57′17″W
Port Renfrew (Mill Bay Marine Group)	CMB9	PR	Mill Bay Marine Group	11 ft (3.4 m)	Port Renfrew	British Columbia		48°33′21″N 124°24′52″W
Poste Lemoyne (Complex LG-3)	CSY6	PR	Hydro-Québec	874 ft (266 m)	Poste Lemoyne	Quebec		53°28′58″N 75°01′53″W
Powell River (Qathet General Hospital)	CPW8	PR	Vancouver Coastal Health	297 ft (91 m)	Powell River	British Columbia		49°51′05″N 124°31′02″W
Prince Albert (Fire Centre)	CAL6	PR	Saskatchewan Ministry of Environment Wildfire Management	1,476 ft (450 m)	Prince Albert	Saskatchewan		53°13′43″N 105°45′21″W
Prince Albert (Victoria Hospital)	CPV3	PR	Victoria Hospital	1,515 ft (462 m)	Prince Albert	Saskatchewan		53°11′26″N 105°47′01″W
Prince Rupert (Hospital)	CBR8	PR	Northern Health Authority	268 ft (82 m)	Prince Rupert	British Columbia		54°18′19″N 130°19′48″W
Prince Rupert/Seal Cove (Coast Guard)	CBY5	PR	Coast Guard	17 ft (5.2 m)	Prince Rupert	British Columbia		54°19′54″N 130°16′36″W
Prince Rupert/Seal Cove (Public)	CBF6	PU	Seal Cove Airport Society	17 ft (5.2 m)	Prince Rupert	British Columbia		54°19′47″N 130°16′45″W
Qualicum Beach (Aerosmith Heli Service)	CAS5	PR	Aerosmith Heli Service	292 ft (89 m)	Qualicum Beach	British Columbia		49°18′25″N 124°24′48″W
Quebec/Capitale Hélicoptère	CCH7	PR	Centre d'Affaires Capitale Hélipro	203 ft (62 m)	Quebec City	Quebec		46°48′03″N 71°22′27″W
Red Deer/Allan Dale Residence	CAD2	PR	Allan Dale	3,123 ft (952 m)	Red Deer	Alberta		52°16′11″N 113°41′59″W
Red Deer/Allan Dale Trailers & RV	CAD3	PR	Allan Dale	2,936 ft (895 m)	Red Deer	Alberta		52°18′32″N 113°51′48″W
Red Deer/Chong Residence	CRE5	PR	Glenn Chong	2,856 ft (871 m)	Red Deer	Alberta		52°21′00″N 113°56′01″W
Red Deer/Leblanc	CLB5	PR	Marcel LeBlanc	3,028 ft (923 m)	Red Deer	Alberta		52°12′52″N 113°42′00″W
Red Deer Regional Hospital Centre	CRD3	PR	Alberta Health Services	2,876 ft (877 m)	Red Deer	Alberta		52°15′43″N 113°48′57″W
Red Lake (Margaret Cochenour Memorial Hospital)	CRL3	PR	Margaret Cochenour Memorial Hospital	1,254 ft (382 m)	Red Lake	Ontario		51°00′49″N 93°49′19″W
Redwater (Health Centre)	CRW8	PR	Alberta Health Services	2,083 ft (635 m)	Redwater	Alberta		53°56′59″N 113°07′38″W
Redwater (Heliworks)	CRW2	PR	Heliworks Aviation	2,200 ft (670 m)	Redwater	Alberta		53°55′09″N 113°06′15″W
Redwater (Pembina)	CRP3	PR	Pembina Corporation	2,081 ft (634 m)	Redwater	Alberta		53°49′29″N 113°07′47″W
Regina General Hospital	CRQ2	PR	Saskatchewan Health Authority	1,981 ft (604 m)	Regina	Saskatchewan		50°26′38″N 104°36′05″W
Renfrew (Victoria Hospital)	CPG9	PR	Renfrew Victoria Hospital	400 ft (120 m)	Renfrew	Ontario		45°28′57″N 76°41′46″W
Revelstoke (Queen Victoria Hospital)	CQV3	PR	Queen Victoria Hospital	1,549 ft (472 m)	Revelstoke	British Columbia		50°58′40″N 118°11′22″W
Rimbey (Hospital & Care Centre)	CRH5	PR	Alberta Health Services	3,066 ft (935 m)	Rimbey	Alberta		52°38′25″N 114°14′50″W
Rivière-du-Loup	CSS2	PR	Canadian Coast Guard	10 ft (3.0 m)	Rivière-du-Loup	Quebec		47°50′56″N 69°32′32″W
Rockton (Onward Aviation Private)	CRO2	PR	Queen Victoria Air	836 ft (255 m)	Rockton	Ontario		43°18′45″N 80°07′46″W
Rocky Mountain House (Health Centre)	CEU4	PR	FM&E AHS	3,330 ft (1,010 m)	Rocky Mountain House	Alberta		52°22′44″N 114°55′15″W
Sable Island	CST5	PR	Parks Canada	15 ft (4.6 m)	Sable Island	Nova Scotia		43°55′59″N 60°00′20″W
Sagard	CSG9	PR	Canadian Helicopters	785 ft (239 m)	Sagard	Quebec		47°59′27″N 70°04′39″W
Saguenay/Oligny	COL5	PR	Chantel Lussier	551 ft (168 m)	Saguenay	Quebec		48°18′58″N 71°13′21″W
Ste-Anne (Hospital)	CHS6	PR	Santé Sud-Southern Health	831 ft (253 m)	Ste. Anne	Manitoba		49°40′04″N 96°38′50″W
Saint-Augustin	CTH9	PU	Transports Québec	105 ft (32 m)	Saint-Augustin	Quebec		51°13′25″N 58°38′34″W
Saint-Jérôme (Hydro-Québec)	CSZ6	PR	Hydro-Québec	358 ft (109 m)	Saint-Jérôme	Quebec		45°46′16″N 74°01′37″W
Saint-Michel	CML9	PR	Chantel Lussier	220 ft (67 m)	Saint-Michel	Quebec		45°15′18″N 73°33′03″W
Saint-Remi-d'Amherst/Kanata Tremblant Resort	CKT6	PR	Air Kanata	950 ft (290 m)	Saint-Remi-d'Amherst	Quebec		45°59′30″N 74°44′59″W
St. Catharines (Niagara Health System)	CNH4	PR	Niagara Health System	336 ft (102 m)	St. Catharines	Ontario		43°09′06″N 79°16′50″W
Sainte-Agathe (AIM)	CSV2	PR	La Compagnie Américaine de Fer st Métaux	1,250 ft (380 m)	Sainte-Agathe-des-Monts	Quebec		46°06′40″N 74°17′38″W
Sainte-Barbe	CBB8	PR	Chantel Lussier	150 ft (46 m)	Sainte-Barbe	Quebec		45°10′37″N 74°13′11″W
St. John's (Health Sciences Centre)	CCK2	PR	Eastern Health Care	216 ft (66 m)	St. John's	Newfoundland and Labrador		47°34′21″N 52°44′44″W
St. John's (Quinlan Heliflight Services)	CDC2	PR	Quinlan Heliflight Services	412 ft (126 m)	St. John's	Newfoundland and Labrador		47°36′30″N 52°43′37″W
Saint John (Regional Hospital)	CSN6	PR	Saint John Regional Hospital Atlantic Health Sciences Corporation	246 ft (75 m)	Saint John	New Brunswick		45°18′08″N 66°05′17″W
St. Paul (Saint Therese Healthcare Centre)	CTP5	PR	Alberta Health Services	2,113 ft (644 m)	St. Paul	Alberta		53°59′17″N 111°17′26″W
Sarnia (Bluewater Health)	CBW5	PR	Bluewater Health	598 ft (182 m)	Sarnia	Ontario		42°58′31″N 82°23′17″W
Saskatoon (Jim Pattison Children's Hospital)	CJP4	PR	Saskatchewan Health Authority	1,758 ft (536 m)	Saskatoon	Saskatchewan		52°07′55″N 106°38′33″W
Sault Ste. Marie	CNR3	PU	Canadian Bushplane Heritage Centre	580 ft (180 m)	Sault Ste. Marie	Ontario		46°30′16″N 84°19′24″W
Sault Ste. Marie (Sault Area Hospital)	CSM9	PR	Sault Area Hospital	797 ft (243 m)	Sault Ste. Marie	Ontario		46°32′51″N 84°18′45″W
Schomberg/Amaroo	CNA6	PR	D. Valela	1,125 ft (343 m)	Schomberg	Ontario		43°57′17″N 79°37′08″W
Sechelt (Sechelt Hospital)	CBP4	PR	Vancouver Coastal Health	179 ft (55 m)	Sechelt	British Columbia		49°28′34″N 123°44′54″W
Sept-Îles (H, Stever)	CHS2	PR	Harvey Stever	125 ft (38 m)	Sept-Îles	Quebec		50°12′40″N 66°17′05″W
Sept-Îles/Héli-Boréal	CHB4	PR	Héli-Boréal	218 ft (66 m)	Sept-Îles	Quebec		50°17′25″N 66°24′44″W
Sept-Îles (Hydro-Québec)	CTA2	PR	Hydro-Québec	220 ft (67 m)	Sept-Îles	Quebec		50°17′17″N 66°24′33″W
Sept-Îles/Mustang Helicopters	CHE3	PR	Mustang Helicopters	215 ft (66 m)	Sept-Îles	Quebec		50°17′20″N 66°24′44″W
Shawnigan Lake (Elie Acres)	CLE3	PR	Banyan Properties	1,010 ft (310 m)	Shawnigan Lake	British Columbia		48°33′46″N 123°36′10″W
Shearwater (CFB Shearwater, Halifax/Shearwater)	CYAW / YAW	MI	DND	144 ft (44 m)	Shearwater	Nova Scotia		44°38′14″N 63°30′08″W
Shefford	CSC4	PR	Denis Charest	721 ft (220 m)	Shefford	Quebec		45°20′09″N 72°35′37″W
Shelburne (Roseway Hospital)	CCZ9	PR	Roseway Hospital	75 ft (23 m)	Shelburne	Nova Scotia		43°45′01″N 65°18′35″W
Sherbrooke (CHUS)/François Desourdy	CSG7	PR	Centre hospitalier universitaire de Sherbrooke	722 ft (220 m)	Sherbrooke	Quebec		45°26′52″N 71°52′17″W
Shubenacadie	CSU4	PR	Nova Scotia Department of Natural Resources and Renewables	80 ft (24 m)	Shubenacadie	Nova Scotia		45°05′36″N 63°23′43″W
Shunda (Fire Base)	CDA7	PR	FERD – Rocky Mountain House Wildfire Management Area	4,690 ft (1,430 m)	Shunda	Alberta		52°29′26″N 115°45′31″W
Sicamous/Owls Landing	COL4	PR	Guy Maris	1,394 ft (425 m)	Sicamous	British Columbia		50°48′39″N 115°58′13″W
Simco (Norfolk General Hospital)	CPA8	PR	Simco (Norfolk General Hospital)	716 ft (218 m)	Simcoe	Ontario		42°50′50″N 80°19′13″W
Slave Lake/Slave Lake Helicopters	CSL6	PR	Slave Lake Helicopters	1,902 ft (580 m)	Slave Lake	Alberta		55°17′36″N 114°46′53″W
Smithers (Canadian)	CAA6	PR	Canadian Helicopters	1,600 ft (490 m)	Smithers	British Columbia		54°46′30″N 127°08′06″W
Smiths Falls (Community Hospital)	CNS9	PR	Smiths Falls Community Hospital	409 ft (125 m)	Smiths Falls	Ontario		44°54′26″N 76°01′40″W
Smokey Lake (George McDougall Health Centre)	CGM2	PR	Alberta Health Services	2,009 ft (612 m)	Smoky Lake	Alberta		54°07′18″N 112°27′57″W
Snow Lake (Gogal)	CSN5	PR	Brad Gogal	974 ft (297 m)	Snow Lake	Manitoba		52°54′48″N 100°00′59″W
Sonora Resort	CSR6	PR	London Enterprises	46 ft (14 m)	Sonora Island	British Columbia		50°22′54″N 125°09′27″W
Stettler (Hospital & Care Centre)	CLH2	PR	Alberta Health Services	2,694 ft (821 m)	Stettler	Alberta		52°19′24″N 112°43′31″W
Stony Plain (Westview Health Centre)	CSP2	PR	Capital Health Authority	2,311 ft (704 m)	Stony Plain	Alberta		53°32′17″N 113°58′42″W
Strathmore (District Health Services)	CSM2	PR	Alberta Health Services	3,216 ft (980 m)	Strathmore	Alberta		51°03′36″N 113°23′10″W
Sturgeon Falls (West Nipissing General Hospital)	CNM3	PR	West Nipissing General Hospital	680 ft (210 m)	Sturgeon Falls	Ontario		46°22′24″N 79°54′58″W
Sudbury (Health Sciences North) Hospital	CSL8	PR	Health Sciences North Sudbury	985 ft (300 m)	Greater Sudbury	Ontario		46°28′05″N 80°59′46″W
Sudbury/Kelly Lake	CSU8	PU	Todd Thomas	833 ft (254 m)	Greater Sudbury	Ontario		46°26′58″N 81°02′42″W
Sudbury/Lively (Skyline Helicopter Technologies)	CSK7	PR	Skyline Helicopter Technologies	860 ft (260 m)	Greater Sudbury	Ontario		46°26′08″N 81°07′19″W
Summerside (Prince County Hospital)	CCH6	PR	Health PEI	39 ft (12 m)	Summerside	Prince Edward Islandd		46°25′04″N 63°46′26″W
Sundre (Hospital & Health Care Centre)	CSD2	PR	Alberta Health Services	3,588 ft (1,094 m)	Sundre	Alberta		51°48′26″N 114°38′12″W
Swift Current (Cypress Regional Hospital)	CCY2	PR	Saskatchewan Health Authority	2,412 ft (735 m)	Swift Current	Saskatchewan		50°18′39″N 107°46′27″W
Sydney (Cape Breton Regional Hospital)	CSY9	PR	Cape Breton Regional Hospital	204 ft (62 m)	Sydney	Nova Scotia		46°06′36″N 60°10′34″W
Taber (Health Centre)	CTB7	PR	Alberta Health Services	2,670 ft (810 m)	Taber	Alberta		49°47′08″N 112°09′58″W
Thompson	CKM7	PR	Manitoba Hydro	702 ft (214 m)	Thompson	Manitoba		55°42′27″N 97°53′29″W
Thornbury/Fossil Beach (Blue Mountain)	CFB9	PR	MKCK Holdings	588 ft (179 m)	Thornbury	Ontario		44°32′20″N 80°22′33″W
Three Hills (Hospital)	CFA8	PR	Alberta Health Services	3,000 ft (910 m)	Three Hills	Alberta		51°42′31″N 113°15′07″W
Thunder Bay (Health Science Centre)	CTB2	PR	Thunder Bay Regional Health Sciences Centre	715 ft (218 m)	Thunder Bay	Ontario		48°25′24″N 89°16′11″W
Timmins (Timmins & District Hospital)	CTM6	PR	Timmins and District Hospital	950 ft (290 m)	Timmins	Ontario		48°29′13″N 81°18′49″W
Tofield (Health Centre)	CTF2	PR	Alberta Health Services	2,297 ft (700 m)	Tofield	Alberta		53°22′23″N 112°39′02″W
Tofino (General Hospital)	CBC8	PR	Island Health	60 ft (18 m)	Tofino	British Columbia		49°09′04″N 125°54′33″W
Tofino Lifeboat Station	CBR7 / YAZ	PR	Canadian Coast Guard	10 ft (3.0 m)	Tofino	British Columbia		49°09′16″N 125°54′07″W
Toronto/Chartright Polson Pier	CPP4	PR	Polson Parking Corporation	251 ft (77 m)	Toronto	Ontario		43°38′30″N 79°21′22″W
Toronto (Hospital For Sick Children)	CNW8	PR	Hospital for Sick Children	497 ft (151 m)	Toronto	Ontario		43°39′25″N 79°23′16″W
Toronto/Markham Stouffville	CPH7	PR	Markham Stouffville Hospital	704 ft (215 m)	Toronto	Ontario		43°52′58″N 79°13′58″W
Toronto (Mississauga Credit Valley Hospital)	CPK6	PR	Credit Valley Hospital	523 ft (159 m)	Toronto	Ontario		43°33′41″N 79°42′10″W
Toronto (St. Michael's Hospital)	CTM4	PR	St. Michael's Hospital	528 ft (161 m)	Toronto	Ontario		43°39′15″N 79°22′42″W
Toronto (Sunnybrook Health Science Centre)	CNY8	PR	Sunnybrook Health Sciences Centre	612 ft (187 m)	Toronto	Ontario		43°43′17″N 79°22′37″W
Toronto/Tarten	CPA5	PR	Tarten Equipment	560 ft (170 m)	Toronto	Ontario		43°39′14″N 79°39′28″W
Toronto/Wilson's	CPY5	PR	Wilson’s Heli-Trans	370 ft (110 m)	Toronto	Ontario		43°37′04″N 79°33′49″W
Trail (Kootenay Boundary Regional Hospital)	CKB3	PR	Interior Health Authority	1,526 ft (465 m)	Trail	British Columbia		49°06′13″N 117°42′01″W
Truro (Colchester Health Centre)	CEH9	PR	Colchester East Hants Health Centre	140 ft (43 m)	Truro	Nova Scotia		45°20′59″N 63°18′20″W
Two Hills (Health Centre)	CTH4	PR	Two Hills Health Centre	2,075 ft (632 m)	Two Hills	Alberta		53°42′49″N 111°43′51″W
Upsala	CKL8	PR	Ontario Ministry of Health	1,581 ft (482 m)	Upsala	Ontario		49°03′01″N 90°28′09″W
Uxbridge (Cottage Hospital)	CNA5	PR	Uxbridge Cottage Hospital	900 ft (270 m)	Uxbridge	Ontario		44°06′11″N 79°07′42″W
Val-d'Or (St-Pierre)	COR2	PR	Jean-Guy St-Pierre	1,000 ft (300 m)	Val-d'Or	Quebec		48°04′39″N 77°52′07″W
CFB Valcartier	CYOY / YOY	MI	DND	550 ft (170 m)	Saint-Gabriel-de-Valcartier	Quebec		48°54′10″N 71°30′13″W
Valemount (CMH)	CMH6	PR	Canadian Mountain Holidays	2,711 ft (826 m)	Valemount	British Columbia		52°47′18″N 119°15′24″W
Valemount (Yellowhead Helicopters)	CBV7	PR	Yellowhead Helicopters	2,600 ft (790 m)	Valemount	British Columbia		52°51′59″N 119°17′49″W
Valleyview (Health Centre)	CVV2	PR	Valleyview Health Centre	2,339 ft (713 m)	Valleyview	Alberta		55°04′03″N 117°16′18″W
Vancouver (Children & Women's Health Centre)	CAK7	PR	Provincial Health Services Authority	239 ft (73 m)	Vancouver	British Columbia		49°14′38″N 123°07′38″W
Vancouver/Coquitlam Fire and Rescue	CFR6	PR	Coquitlam Fire and Rescue	180 ft (55 m)	Vancouver	British Columbia		49°17′30″N 122°47′32″W
Vancouver (General Hospital)	CBK4	PR	Vancouver Coastal Health	235 ft (72 m)	Vancouver	British Columbia		49°15′43″N 123°07′28″W
Vancouver/Harbour (Public)	CBC7	PR	Pacific Heliport Services	2 ft (0.61 m)	Vancouver	British Columbia		49°17′13″N 123°06′22″W
Vancouver/New Westminster (Royal Columbian Hospital)	CNW9	PR	Fraser Health Authority	238 ft (73 m)	New Westminster	British Columbia		49°13′36″N 122°53′32″W
Vancouver (Surrey Memorial Hospital)	CVS3	PR	Fraser Health Authority	367 ft (112 m)	Surrey	British Columbia		49°10′33″N 122°50′38″W
Vegerville (St. Joseph's General Hospital)	CVG8	PR	Alberta Health Services	2,087 ft (636 m)	Vegreville	Alberta		53°29′38″N 112°01′57″W
Vermilion Health Centre	CVH2	PR	FM&E AHS	2,022 ft (616 m)	Vermilion	Alberta		53°21′21″N 110°52′18″W
Victoria (General Hospital)	CBW7	PR	Island Health	53 ft (16 m)	Victoria	British Columbia		48°28′05″N 123°25′56″W
Victoria Harbour (Camel Point)	CBF7	PR	Pacific Heliport Services	15 ft (4.6 m)	Victoria	British Columbia		48°25′05″N 123°23′17″W
Victoria Harbour (Shoal Point)	CBZ7	PR	Canadian Coast Guard	0 ft (0 m)	Victoria	British Columbia		48°25′23″N 123°23′15″W
Victoria (Royal Jubilee Hospital)	CBK8	PR	Island Health	51 ft (16 m)	Victoria	British Columbia		48°26′03″N 123°19′31″W
Viking Health Centre (George H. Roddick)	CGR5	PR	Alberta Health Services	2,255 ft (687 m)	Viking	Alberta		53°06′06″N 111°46′36″W
Vittoria/Heli-Lynx	CHL4	PR	Heli-Lynx Helicopters	778 ft (237 m)	Vittoria	Ontario		42°48′09″N 80°24′07″W
Vulcan (Hospital)	CVH7	PR	Alberta Health Services	3,452 ft (1,052 m)	Vulcan	Alberta		50°23′45″N 113°15′33″W
CFB Wainwright	CFF7	MI	DND	2,170 ft (660 m)	Wainwright	Alberta		52°49′41″N 110°54′16″W
Walkerton (County Of Bruce General Hospital)	CNG6	PR	County Of Bruce General Hospital	875 ft (267 m)	Walkerton	Ontario		44°07′16″N 81°09′08″W
Wallaceburg/Chatham-Kent Health Alliance (Wallaceburg)	CSY7	PR	Chatham-Kent Health Alliance	581 ft (177 m)	Wallaceburg	Ontario		42°35′57″N 82°22′00″W
Washago/Clearwater Lake North	CLK6	PR	Ashlynne Dale	820 ft (250 m)	Washago	Ontario		44°48′46″N 79°14′29″W
Welland (Niagara Health System)	CPB3	PR	Niagara Health System	585 ft (178 m)	Welland	Ontario		42°58′39″N 79°14′59″W
Westlock (Healthcare Centre)	CAA3	PR	Alberta Health Services	2,153 ft (656 m)	Westlock	Alberta		54°08′48″N 113°51′18″W
Wetaskiwin (Hospital & Care Centre)	CWC4	PR	Alberta Health Services	2,494 ft (760 m)	Wetaskiwin	Alberta		52°59′18″N 113°22′05″W
Whistler (Hospital)	CAW4	PR	Vancouver Coastal Health	2,181 ft (665 m)	Whistler	British Columbia		50°07′13″N 122°57′17″W
Whistler (Municipal)	CBE9 / YWS	PU	Whistler Heliport Society	2,130 ft (650 m)	Whistler	British Columbia		50°10′06″N 122°54′17″W
White Saddle Ranch	CBD9	PR	White Saddle Air Services	2,925 ft (892 m)	White Saddle Ranch	British Columbia		51°44′00″N 124°44′00″W
Williams Lake (Frontline Helicopters)	CFH2 / YWL	PR	Frontline Helicopters	2,679 ft (817 m)	Williams Lake	British Columbia		51°57′52″N 121°48′45″W
Windermere/Rostrevor	CRS6	PR	2653224 Ontario Inc.	811 ft (247 m)	Windermere	Ontario		45°11′00″N 79°34′04″W
Winnipeg (City of Winnipeg)	CWG2	PR	City of Winnipeg	767 ft (234 m)	Winnipeg	Manitoba		49°54′01″N 97°05′44″W
Winnipeg (Health Sciences Centre)	CWH7	PR	Winnipeg Regional Health Authority	880 ft (270 m)	Winnipeg	Manitoba		49°54′15″N 97°09′23″W
Woodstock (Hospital)	CWH3	PR	Honeywell/Woodstock Hospital	1,046 ft (319 m)	Woodstock	Ontario		43°06′20″N 80°45′16″W
Woodstock/Snokist	CSN4	PR	Foxco	481 ft (147 m)	Woodstock	New Brunswick		46°12′10″N 67°39′34″W
Yarmouth (Regional Hospital)	CDU3	PR	Yarmouth Regional Hospital	43 ft (13 m)	Yarmouth	Nova Scotia		43°50′54″N 66°07′17″W
