= List of Canadian airports by location indicator: CP =

This is a list of all Nav Canada certified and registered water and land airports, aerodromes and heliports in the provinces and territories of Canada sorted by location identifier.

They are listed in the format:

- Location indicator – IATA – Airport name (alternate name) – Airport location

== CP– Canada – CAN ==
Also see airport category and list.

TC LID	IATA	Airport name	Community	Province or territory
CPA2		Mount Forest (Louise Marshall Hospital) Heliport	Mount Forest	Ontario
CPA3		Palmerston (District Hospital) Heliport	Palmerston	Ontario
CPA4		Simcoe (Dennison Field) Airport	Simcoe	Ontario
CPA5		Toronto/Tarten Heliport	Toronto	Ontario
CPA6		Hagersville (West Haldimand General Hospital) Heliport	Hagersville	Ontario
CPA7		Meaford (Brightshores Health System) Heliport	Meaford	Ontario
CPA8		Simco (Norfolk General Hospital) Heliport	Simcoe	Ontario
CPA9		Dunnville (Haldimand War Memorial Hospital) Heliport	Dunnville	Ontario
CPB2		Fergus (Groves Memorial Community Hospital) Heliport	Fergus	Ontario
CPB3		Welland (Niagara Health System) Heliport	Welland	Ontario
CPB5		Pilot Butte Airport	Pilot Butte	Saskatchewan
CPB6		Pointe au Baril Station Water Aerodrome	Pointe au Baril	Ontario
CPB7		Bancroft (North Hastings District Hospital) Heliport	Bancroft	Ontario
CPB8		Bistcho Airport	Bistcho Lake	Alberta
CPB9		Baldwin Airport	Baldwin	Ontario
CPC2		Port Carling Aerodrome	Port Carling	Ontario
CPC3		Arthur (Walter's Field) Aerodrome	Arthur	Ontario
CPC4		Brampton (National "D") Heliport	Brampton	Ontario
CPC5		Port Carling (Avon Bay) Water Aerodrome	Port Carling	Ontario
CPC6		Teeswater (Thompson Field) Airport	Teeswater	Ontario
CPC8		Port Carling/W Shores Heliport	Port Carling	Ontario
CPC9		Huntsville (Memorial District Hospital) Heliport	Huntsville	Ontario
CPD2		Ethel Airport	Ethel	Ontario
CPD3		Durham (Memorial Hospital) Heliport	Durham	Ontario
CPD4		Brussels (Armstrong Field) Airport	Brussels	Ontario
CPD5		Paudash Lake (Marina) Water Aerodrome	Paudash (Paudash Lake)	Ontario
CPD6		Parry Sound/St. Waleran Island Water Aerodrome	Parry Sound (Georgian Bay)	Ontario
CPD9		Markdale (Centre Grey General Hospital) Heliport	Markdale	Ontario
CPE2		Ajax-Pickering General Hospital Heliport	Ajax	Ontario
CPE3		Port Carling/Elarton Point Heliport	Port Carling	Ontario
CPE4		Cambridge/Reid's Field Airport	Cambridge	Ontario
CPE5		Port Colborne Airport	Port Colborne	Ontario
CPE6		Sundridge/South River Airpark	South River / Sundridge	Ontario
CPE8		Halkirk/Paintearth (Fetaz) Aerodrome	Halkirk	Alberta
CPF2		Bar River Airport	Bar River	Ontario
CPF3		Dunrobin/Parti Field Aerodrome	Dunrobin	Ontario
CPF4		Cobden/Bruce McPhail Memorial Airport	Cobden	Ontario
CPF6		Stoney Creek Airport	Stoney Creek	Ontario
CPF7		Southampton Aerodrome	Southampton	Ontario
CPF9		Lake Rosseau/Arthurlie Bay Water Aerodrome	Port Carling (Lake Rosseau)	Ontario
CPG3		Fort Erie (Airbus Helicopters Canada Ltd) Heliport	Fort Erie	Ontario
CPG5		Hawkesbury (East) Airport	Hawkesbury	Ontario
CPG7		Fergus (Juergensen Field) Airport	Fergus	Ontario
CPG8		Chatham-Kent Health Alliance (Chatham) Heliport	Chatham-Kent	Ontario
CPG9		Renfrew (Victoria Hospital) Heliport	Renfrew	Ontario
CPH2		Deep River/Rolph Airport	Deep River	Ontario
CPH3		Port Hope (Peter's Field) Aerodrome	Port Hope	Ontario
CPH4		Dolbeau-Mistassini/Potvin Heli-Base Heliport	Dolbeau-Mistassini	Quebec
CPH6		Penticton Regional Hospital Heliport	Penticton	British Columbia
CPH7		Toronto/Markham Stouffville Heliport	Toronto	Ontario
CPH9		Fordwich Airport	Fordwich	Ontario
CPJ2		Alliston Heliport	Alliston	Ontario
CPJ3		Hamilton (McMaster University Medical Centre) Heliport	Hamilton	Ontario
CPJ4		Geraldton (District Hospital) Heliport	Geraldton	Ontario
CPJ5		Stirling Aerodrome	Stirling-Rawdon	Ontario
CPJ6		St-Pierre-Jolys (Carl's Field) Aerodrome	St-Pierre-Jolys	Manitoba
CPJ7		Kingston (General Hospital) Heliport	Kingston	Ontario
CPJ9		Manitowaning Water Aerodrome	Manitowaning	Ontario
CPK2		Strathroy (Blue Yonder) Airport	Strathroy-Caradoc	Ontario
CPK3		Hamilton (General Hospital) Heliport	Hamilton	Ontario
CPK6		Toronto (Mississauga Credit Valley Hospital) Heliport	Toronto	Ontario
CPK7		Ottawa (Children's Hospital) Heliport	Ottawa	Ontario
CPK8		Renfrew/Black Donald Lake Water Aerodrome	Renfrew	Ontario
CPK9		Arthur (Peskett Field) Aerodrome	Arthur	Ontario
CPL2		Bracebridge (South Muskoka Memorial Hospital) Heliport	Bracebridge	Ontario
CPL3		Kars/Rideau Valley Air Park (Rideau Valley Air Park)	Kars	Ontario
CPL4		Grand Bend Airport (RCAF Detachment Grand Bend)	Grand Bend	Ontario
CPL5		Musquodoboit Harbour/Paces Lake Water Aerodrome	Musquodoboit Harbour (Paces Lake)	Nova Scotia
CPL7		Kenora (Peterson’s Landing) Water Aerodrome	Kenora	Ontario
CPL8		Paddy Lake Water Aerodrome	Burwash	Ontario
CPL9		Musquodoboit Harbour/Petpeswick Lake Water Aerodrome	Musquodoboit Harbour (Petpeswick Lake)	Nova Scotia
CPM2		Port-Menier (H. Stever) Heliport	Port-Menier	Quebec
CPM3		Pourvoirie Mirage Aerodrome	Mirage Lodge, Trans-Taiga Road	Quebec
CPM5		Tottenham/Volk Airport	Tottenham	Ontario
CPM7		Bradford Aerodrome	Bradford	Ontario
CPN2		Rodney/Pinder Airfield	Rodney	Ontario
CPN3		Moose Factory Heliport	Moose Factory	Ontario
CPN6		Algoma Mills Water Aerodrome	Algoma Mills	Ontario
CPN8		London (Pioneer Airpark) Aerodrome	London	Ontario
CPN9		Whitefish/Lake Panache Water Aerodrome	Whitefish	Ontario
CPO2		Portage (District General Hospital) Heliport	Portage la Prairie	Manitoba
CPP2		Collingwood (General and Marine Hospital) Heliport	Collingwood	Ontario
CPP3		Port Perry/Hoskin Aerodrome	Port Perry	Ontario
CPP4		Toronto/Chartright Polson Pier Heliport	Toronto	Ontario
CPP6		Grand River Executive Airport	York	Ontario
CPP7		Ottawa (Civic Hospital) Heliport	Ottawa	Ontario
CPP8		Montréal/Passport Hélico Heliport	Montreal	Quebec
CPP9		Sault Ste. Marie/Partridge Point Water Aerodrome	Sault Ste. Marie	Ontario
CPQ3		Niagara Falls Heliport	Niagara Falls	Ontario
CPQ7		Skeleton Lake Water Aerodrome	Skeleton Lake	Ontario
CPR2		Ottawa/Embrun Aerodrome	Embrun	Ontario
CPR4		London (University Hospital) Heliport	London	Ontario
CPR5		Woodstock (Norm Beckham/Bob Hewitt Field) Aerodrome	Woodstock	Ontario
CPR7		Wingham/Richard W. LeVan Aerodrome	Wingham	Ontario
CPR8		Pincher Creek (Hospital) Heliport	Pincher Creek	Alberta
CPS1		Parry Sound Harbour Water Aerodrome	Parry Sound (Georgian Bay)	Ontario
CPS2		Keene/Elmhirst's Resort Airport	Keene	Ontario
CPS3		Parry Sound (Portage Lake) Water Aerodrome	Parry Sound	Ontario
CPS4		Lucan Airport	Lucan Biddulph	Ontario
CPS5		Miminiska Airport	Miminiska	Ontario
CPS6		Cornwall (Community Hospital McConnell Site) Heliport	Cornwall	Ontario
CPS7		Parry Sound (B183 Island) Water Aerodrome	Parry Sound (Georgian Bay)	Ontario
CPS8		Parry Sound/Huron Island Water Aerodrome	Parry Sound (Georgian Bay)	Ontario
CPS9		Parry Sound/Frying Pan Island-Sans Souci Water Aerodrome	Parry Sound (Georgian Bay)	Ontario
CPT2		Killarney Airport	Killarney	Ontario
CPT3		Rockton Airport	Rockton	Ontario
CPT7		Mattawa Water Aerodrome	Mattawa	Ontario
CPT8		Parry Sound/Deep Bay Water Aerodrome	Parry Sound	Ontario
CPT9		Pintendre Aerodrome	Pintendre	Quebec
CPU2		Kincardine (South Bruce Grey Health Centre) Heliport	Kincardine	Ontario
CPU4		Manitouwadge (Santé/Health) Heliport	Manitouwadge	Ontario
CPU5		Orillia/Matchedash Lake Water Aerodrome	Orillia	Ontario
CPU6		Tyendinaga (Mohawk) Airport	Tyendinaga	Ontario
CPV2		Orangeville/Castlewood Field Aerodrome	Orangeville	Ontario
CPV3		Prince Albert (Victoria Hospital) Heliport	Prince Albert	Saskatchewan
CPV4		Mansfield Airport	Mansfield	Ontario
CPV5		Head Lake Water Aerodrome	Head Lake	Ontario
CPV6		Barry's Bay (St. Francis Memorial Hospital) Heliport	Barry's Bay	Ontario
CPV7	YHP	Poplar Hill Airport	Poplar Hill First Nation	Ontario
CPV8	KEW	Keewaywin Airport	Keewaywin First Nation	Ontario
CPV9		Poverty Valley Aerodrome	Poverty Valley	Saskatchewan
CPW2		London (Victoria Hospital) Heliport	London	Ontario
CPW6		Midland (Huronia District Hospital) Heliport	Midland	Ontario
CPW8		Powell River (Qathet General Hospital) Heliport	Powell River	British Columbia
CPW9		Port Alberni Water Aerodrome	Port Alberni	British Columbia
CPX2		Marathon (Wilson Memorial Hospital) Heliport	Marathon	Ontario
CPX6		Port Perry (Lakeridge Health) Heliport	Port Perry	Ontario
CPX8		Sault Ste. Marie Water Aerodrome	Sault Ste. Marie	Ontario
CPY2		Milton (District Hospital) Heliport	Milton	Ontario
CPY3		Beardmore (Health Centre) Heliport	Beardmore	Ontario
CPY5		Toronto/Wilson's Heliport	Toronto	Ontario
CPY7		Huntsville/Bella Lake Water Aerodrome	Huntsville	Ontario
CPY8		Port Carling/Butterfly Lake Water Aerodrome	Port Carling	Ontario
CPY9		Fergus (Holyoake Airfield) Aerodrome	Fergus	Ontario
CPZ2		Alliston (Stevenson Memorial Hospital) Heliport	Alliston	Ontario
CPZ3		Trenton/Mountain View Airport (CFD Mountain View)	Mountain View	Ontario
CPZ6		Montréal/Point Zero Heliport	Montreal	Quebec
CPZ9		Billy Bishop Toronto City Water Aerodrome	Toronto	Ontario

== CQ– Canada – CAN ==
Also see airport category and list.

TC LID	IATA	Airport name	Community	Province or territory
CQV3		Revelstoke (Queen Victoria Hospital) Heliport	Revelstoke	British Columbia
