= List of Canadian airports by location indicator: CN =

This is a list of all Nav Canada certified and registered water and land airports, aerodromes and heliports in the provinces and territories of Canada sorted by location identifier.

They are listed in the format:

- Location indicator – IATA – Airport name (alternate name) – Airport location

== CN – Canada – CAN ==
Also see airport category and list.

TC LID	IATA	Airport name	Community	Province or territory
CNA2		Highgate Airport	Highgate	Ontario
CNA3		Springwater (Barrie Airpark) Aerodrome	Springwater	Ontario
CNA4		Emsdale Airport	Emsdale	Ontario
CNA5		Uxbridge (Cottage Hospital) Heliport	Uxbridge	Ontario
CNA6		Schomberg/Amaroo Heliport	Schomberg	Ontario
CNA9		Plevna/Tomvale Airport	Plevna	Ontario
CNB2		Bolton Heliport	Bolton	Ontario
CNB3		North Bay (North Bay Regional Health Centre) Heliport	North Bay	Ontario
CNB4		Cobourg (Northumberland Hills Hospital) Heliport	Cobourg	Ontario
CNB5		Arnprior Water Aerodrome	Arnprior	Ontario
CNB6		Newburgh Aerodrome	Newburgh	Ontario
CNB8		Sudbury/Ramsey Lake Water Aerodrome	Greater Sudbury	Ontario
CNC2		Cornwall (DEV Centre) Heliport	Cornwall	Ontario
CNC3		Brampton-Caledon Airport	Brampton	Ontario
CNC4		Guelph Airpark	Guelph	Ontario
CNC5		Sudbury/Azilda Water Aerodrome	Greater Sudbury	Ontario
CNC7		Lake Muskoka/Mortimer's Point Water Aerodrome	Port Carling (Lake Muskoka)	Ontario
CNC8		Temagami Water Aerodrome	Temagami	Ontario
CNC9		Perth (Great War Memorial Hospital) Heliport	Perth	Ontario
CND4		Haliburton/Stanhope Municipal Airport	Haliburton	Ontario
CND6		Granitehill Lake Water Aerodrome	Hornepayne	Ontario
CND7		New Denver/Slocan Community (Health Centre) Heliport	New Denver	British Columbia
CND9		Portage Lake Water Aerodrome	Port Loring (Portage Lake)	Ontario
CNE3	XBE	Bearskin Lake Airport	Bearskin Lake First Nation	Ontario
CNE4		Iroquois Falls Airport	Iroquois Falls	Ontario
CNE5		Bar River Water Aerodrome	Bar River	Ontario
CNE7		Nakina Water Aerodrome	Nakina	Ontario
CNE9		Essex Airport	Essex	Ontario
CNF2		Haliburton (Hospital) Heliport	Haliburton	Ontario
CNF3		Pendleton Airport	Pendleton	Ontario
CNF4		Lindsay/Kawartha Lakes Municipal Airport	Lindsay	Ontario
CNF8		Dwight Aerodrome	Dwight	Ontario
CNG2		New Glasgow (Aberdeen Hospital) Heliport	New Glasgow	Nova Scotia
CNG5		Pembroke (Regional Hospital) Heliport	Pembroke	Ontario
CNG6		Walkerton (County Of Bruce General Hospital) Heliport	Walkerton	Ontario
CNG8		Niagara Falls (Greater Niagara General Hospital) Heliport	Niagara Falls	Ontario
CNH2		Natuashish Airport	Natuashish	Newfoundland and Labrador
CNH3		Nipawin Hospital Heliport	Nipawin	Saskatchewan
CNH4		St. Catharines (Niagara Health System) Heliport	St. Catharines	Ontario
CNH6		Hawk Junction Water Aerodrome	Hawk Junction	Ontario
CNH7		North Bay Water Aerodrome	North Bay	Ontario
CNJ4		Orillia Rama Regional Airport	Orillia	Ontario
CNJ5		Hearst/Carey Lake Water Aerodrome	Hearst	Ontario
CNJ6		Hornepayne Water Aerodrome	Hornepayne	Ontario
CNJ8	YWR	White River Water Aerodrome	White River	Ontario
CNK4	YPD	Parry Sound Area Municipal Airport	Parry Sound	Ontario
CNK6		Owen Sound (Brightshores Health System) Heliport	Owen Sound	Ontario
CNK7		Canmore/Nakoda Heliport	Canmore	Alberta
CNL2		Fort McMurray (North Liege) Aerodrome	Fort McMurray	Alberta
CNL3	XBR	Brockville Regional Tackaberry Airport	Brockville	Ontario
CNL4		Port Elgin Airport	Port Elgin	Ontario
CNL6		Renfrew/Hurds Lake Water Aerodrome	Renfrew	Ontario
CNL7		Nora Lake/Comak Landing Water Landing	Dorset	Ontario
CNL9		Nueltin Lake Airport	Nueltin Lake	Manitoba
CNM2		Melbourne Aerodrome	Melbourne	Ontario
CNM3		Sturgeon Falls (West Nipissing General Hospital) Heliport	Sturgeon Falls	Ontario
CNM5	KIF	Kingfisher Lake Airport	Kingfisher First Nation	Ontario
CNM6		Naramata Heliport	Naramata	British Columbia
CNN3		Shelburne/Fisher Field Aerodrome	Shelburne	Ontario
CNN5		Cochrane Water Aerodrome	Cochrane	Ontario
CNN7		Gooderham/Pencil Lake Water Aerodrome	Gooderham	Ontario
CNN8		Gananoque Airport	Gananoque	Ontario
CNO9		Fort McMurray/Northern Lights Regional Health Centre Heliport	Fort McMurray	Alberta
CNP2		Seagrave/North Port Water Aerodrome	Seagrave	Ontario
CNP3		Arnprior Airport	Arnprior	Ontario
CNP4		Seagrave/North Port Aerodrome	Seagrave	Ontario
CNP6		Nampa/Hockey Aerodrome	Nampa	Alberta
CNP7		Iroquois Airport	Iroquois	Ontario
CNP8		Greenbank Airport	Greenbank	Ontario
CNP9		Norland/Shadow Lake (Penny) Water Aerodrome	Norland (Shadow Lake)	Ontario
CNQ3		Niagara Central Dorothy Rungeling Airport (Welland/Niagara Central Dorothy Rungeling Airport)	Welland	Ontario
CNQ5		Constance Lake Water Aerodrome	Constance Lake	Ontario
CNQ6		Keene/Elmhirst's Resort Water Aerodrome	Keene	Ontario
CNQ7		Port Loring Water Aerodrome	Port Loring	Ontario
CNR2		Innerkip Aerodrome	Innerkip	Ontario
CNR3		Sault Ste. Marie Heliport	Sault Ste. Marie	Ontario
CNR4		Tobermory Airport	Tobermory	Ontario
CNR5		Norland/Trotter Aerodrome	Norland	Ontario
CNR6		Carleton Place Airport	Carleton Place	Ontario
CNS2		Smoky Lake Water Aerodrome	Port Loring	Ontario
CNS3		Englehart (District Hospital) Heliport	Englehart	Ontario
CNS4		Alexandria Aerodrome	Alexandria	Ontario
CNS8		Morrisburg Airport	Morrisburg	Ontario
CNS9		Smiths Falls (Community Hospital) Heliport	Smiths Falls	Ontario
CNT2		Nobel/Sawdust Bay Water Aerodrome	Nobel	Ontario
CNT4		Little Current (Manitoulin Health Centre) Heliport	Little Current	Ontario
CNT5		Lake Muskoka/Dudley Bay Water Aerodrome	Bala (Lake Muskoka)	Ontario
CNT6		Elmira Airport	Elmira	Ontario
CNT9		Newtonville/Steeves Field Aerodrome	Newtonville	Ontario
CNU3		Peterborough (Regional Health Centre) Heliport	Peterborough	Ontario
CNU4		Belleville (Marker Field) Aerodrome	Belleville	Ontario
CNU6		Huntsville Water Aerodrome	Huntsville	Ontario
CNU8		Markham Airport (Toronto/Markham Airport)	Markham	Ontario
CNV2		Inverness (Consolidated Memorial Hospital) Heliport	Inverness	Nova Scotia
CNV3		New Liskeard (Temiskaming Hospital) Heliport	New Liskeard	Ontario
CNV4		Hawkesbury Airport	Hawkesbury	Ontario
CNV5		Elk Lake Water Aerodrome	Elk Lake	Ontario
CNV6		Orillia/Lake St John (Orillia Rama Regional) Water Aerodrome	Orillia	Ontario
CNV8		Edenvale Airport	Edenvale	Ontario
CNV9		Neuville Airport (Quebec/Neuville Airport)	Neuville	Quebec
CNW3		Bancroft Airport	Bancroft	Ontario
CNW4		Mindemoya (Hospital) Heliport	Mindemoya	Ontario
CNW8		Toronto (Hospital For Sick Children) Heliport	Toronto	Ontario
CNW9		Vancouver/New Westminster (Royal Columbian Hospital) Heliport	New Westminster	British Columbia
CNX3		Carey Lake Airport	Carey Lake	Ontario
CNX7		Port Stanton/Sparrow Lake Water Aerodrome	Port Stanton	Ontario
CNX8		Nixon Airport	Nixon	Ontario
CNY3		Collingwood Airport	Collingwood	Ontario
CNY4		Alliston Airport	Alliston	Ontario
CNY8		Toronto (Sunnybrook Health Science Centre) Heliport	Toronto	Ontario
CNZ2		Anzac (Long Lake) Heliport	Athabasca oil sands	Alberta
CNZ4		Barry's Bay/Madawaska Valley Airpark	Barry's Bay (Madawaska Valley)	Ontario
CNZ6		Georgetown (Georgetown & District Hospital) Heliport	Georgetown	Ontario
CNZ7		Hanover (District Hospital) Heliport	Hanover	Ontario
CNZ8		Grimsby Regional Airport	Grimsby	Ontario

== CO – Canada – CAN ==
Also see airport category and list.

TC LID	IATA	Airport name	Community	Province or territory
COB2		Port Severn/Oak Bay Water Aerodrome	Port Severn	Ontario
COK2		Calgary/Okotoks (GG Ranch) Heliport	Okotoks	Alberta
COK3		Oakwood Aerodrome	Oakwood	Ontario
COL2		Orangeville/Laurel Aerodrome	Orangeville	Ontario
COL4		Sicamous/Owls Landing Heliport	Sicamous	British Columbia
COL5		Saguenay/Oligny Heliport	Saguenay	Quebec
COP2		Orillia (Ontario Provincial Police) Heliport	Orillia	Ontario
COP3		Lake Rosseau/Onnalinda Point Water Aerodrome	Port Carling (Lake Rosseau)	Ontario
COP4		Orilla/Pumpkin Bay Water Aerodrome	Orillia (Lake Couchiching)	Ontario
COP5		Cooper Falls Aerodrome	Cooper's Falls	Ontario
COR2		Val-d'Or (St-Pierre) Heliport	Val-d'Or	Quebec
COR3		Orono Field Aerodrome	Orono	Ontario
COS2		Iona Station (Bobier Strip) Aerodrome	Iona Station	Ontario
