= VJH =

VJH may refer to:

- Vernon Jubilee Hospital, a hospital in Vernon, British Columbia, Canada
- Victoria Jubilee Hospital, a hospital in Kingston, Jamaica
