= New Denver (disambiguation) =

New Denver is a village in British Columbia, Canada.

New Denver may also refer to:

- New Denver (album), an album by Motel Motel
- New Denver (Health Centre), in the list of heliports in Canada

== See also ==
- Denver International Airport, the replacement for Stapleton International Airport, U.S.
