= Vernon Jubilee Hospital =

- Interior Health
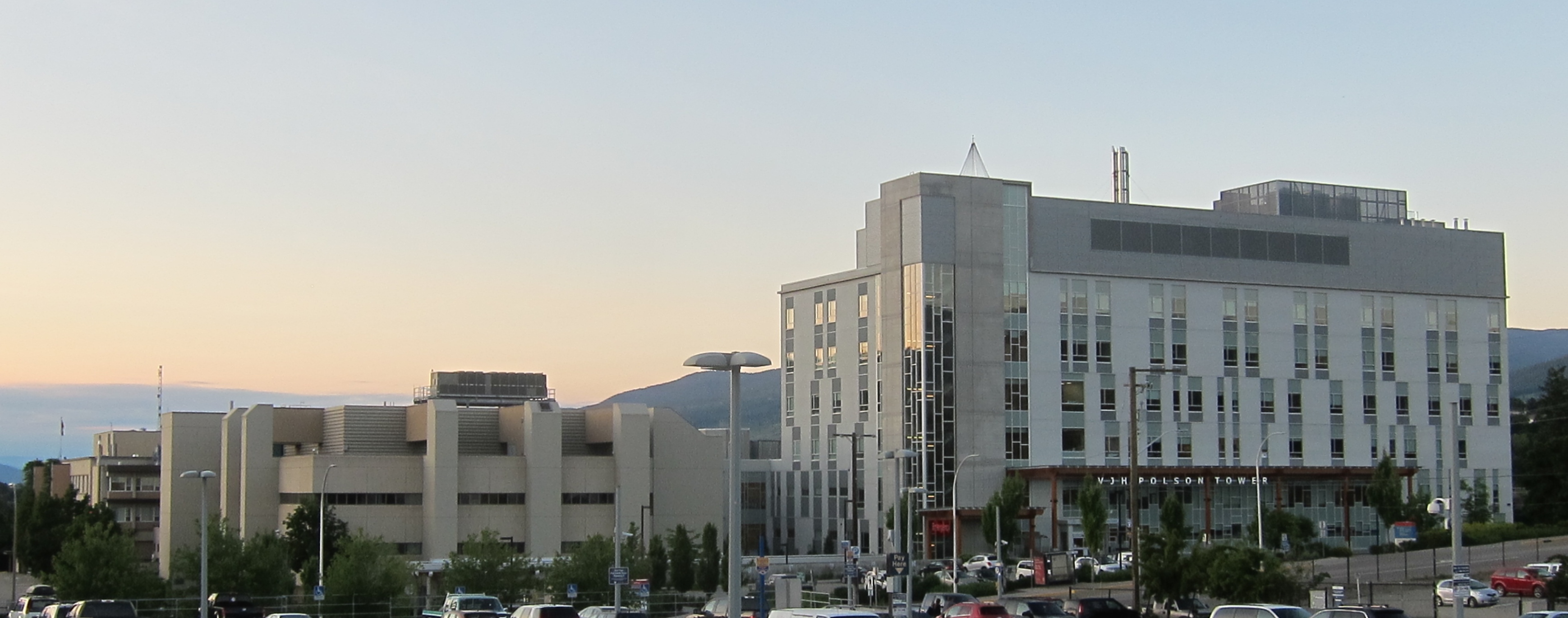

Geography
- Location: 2101 32nd Street; Vernon, British Columbia, Canada
- Coordinates: 50°15′27″N 119°16′20″W

Organization
- Type: General
- Affiliated university: UBC Faculty of Medicine

Services
- Emergency department: Yes
- Beds: 196

History
- Founded: 1897

Links
- Website: www.interiorhealth.ca/locations/vernon-jubilee-hospital
- Lists: Hospitals in Canada

Vernon Jubilee Hospital is a hospital located in Vernon, British Columbia, a city in the Okanagan region of Canada, between Kelowna and Kamloops. Initial examinations for constructing a hospital in Vernon began in 1895, when residents demanded one be created. The hospital was incorporated in 1897 and now serves the Regional District of North Okanagan. The hospital is divided into two main portions: the Old Tower and the newer Polson Tower. The Vernon Jubilee Hospital has 196 beds and offers core physician specialties, an emergency department, and obstetrical care. Patients who need services that the hospital does not provide are transferred to Kelowna General Hospital, in the nearby city of Kelowna.

The addition of 60 beds and the completion of the sixth and seventh floor at Vernon Jubilee Hospital Polson Tower, originally set aside, with future patient needs in mind.

Of the 60 beds, 14 will be new and the remaining 46 will be relocated from elsewhere in the hospital. The beds will be used primarily for single-patient rooms. Previously, they were located in four-bed and double-occupancy wards. The total number of beds at the Vernon Jubilee Hospital will increase from 140 regular and eight temporary beds (148 total) to 162 beds. Completed as part of the Kelowna / Vernon Hospitals Project, the Polson Tower includes an expanded emergency, maternity and pediatrics department, ambulatory care, surgical services, intensive care, and medical device reprocessing. The Polson Tower was also recently awarded a LEED Gold certification and is the first building in Vernon to achieve this. The Polson Tower was officially opened for patients in October 2011. The $180-million Polson Tower added 16,815 square metres (181,000 square feet) of space to the Vernon Jubilee Hospital site. Vernon Jubilee Hospital provides core medical and surgical specialty services, including 24-hour emergency and trauma services, as well as acute and obstetrical care.
