= St. Michael's Health Centre =

Hospital in Lethbridge, Alberta, Canada

- Covenant Health

Geography
- Location: Lethbridge, Alberta, Canada
- Coordinates: 49°41′09″N 112°48′56″W

Organization
- Type: Specialist

Services
- Speciality: Long term care

History
- Opened: 1929

Links
- Lists: Hospitals in Canada

St. Michael's Health Centre is located in Lethbridge, Alberta and offers a multi-faceted range of rehabilitation, palliative and continuing care services within the Chinook Health Region. The organization currently meets the needs of 156 continuing care residents, 36 rehabilitation patients and 10 palliative care patients in a home-like environment.

== History ==
The Sisters of St. Martha opened the St. Michael's General Hospital at 13 Street South and 9 Avenue South in 1929. In 1955, the Lethbridge City Council built a municipal hospital nearby where the CRH is located today.

Up until 1960, both hospitals received several expansions. The Alberta Department of Health later evaluated them and discovered both needed substantial structural upgrades. The decision was made to rebuild the municipal hospital and redesign St. Michael's as a long-term facility.
