= South Okanagan General Hospital =

- Interior Health

Geography
- Location: 7139 362 Avenue, Oliver, British Columbia, Canada
- Coordinates: 49.18344°N 119.53907°W

Organization
- Care system: Medicare
- Type: Acute

Services
- Emergency department: Yes

Links
- Website: www.interiorhealth.ca/locations/south-okanagan-general-hospital
- Lists: Hospitals in Canada

South Okanagan General Hospital is a hospital operating under the governance of Interior Health. It is located in the town of Oliver, British Columbia, Canada, on 7139 362 Avenue.

It was founded in 1973 as a replacement for the St. Martin's Hospital. The hospital has obtained $CAN200,000 for emergency care, also having lost a number of beds at the hospital needed for patients. It operates an emergency service.

== See also ==
- List of hospitals in Canada
