= Arrow Lakes Hospital =

Public hospital in Nakusp, British Columbia, Canada

- Interior Health
- Location in British Columbia

Geography
- Location: Nakusp, British Columbia, Canada
- Coordinates: 50°14′18″N 117°47′43″W

Organization
- Care system: Medicare (Canada)
- Type: Community

Services
- Emergency department: Yes
- Beds: 6

Helipads
- Helipad: TC LID: CAL2

Links
- Website: Arrow Lakes Hospital website

Arrow Lakes Hospital is a six-bed hospital facility, located in Nakusp, British Columbia. The hospital is owned and operated by Interior Health in the Kootenay Boundary Health Service Area.

== History ==
In 2018, the provincial government announced $2.1 million for upgrades to the hospital including new triage facilities, trauma bays and renovation to existing patient exam bays.

== Services ==
The hospital serves the village and the nearby communities including Edgewood, New Denver and Slocan.

It services include:

- Laboratory and radiology (x-ray) services
- 24/7 Emergency services
- Acute-care beds for patient admissions for general medicine, observation, assessment, convalescence and palliative care
- Low-risk obstetrical care
- Outpatient ambulatory-care procedures
- Physiotherapy and some clinics and programs including diabetic education, nutrition consultation, respiratory, cancer-diagnosis support, limited chemotherapy, pastoral care and hospice
