= Banff Mineral Springs Hospital =

- Covenant Health
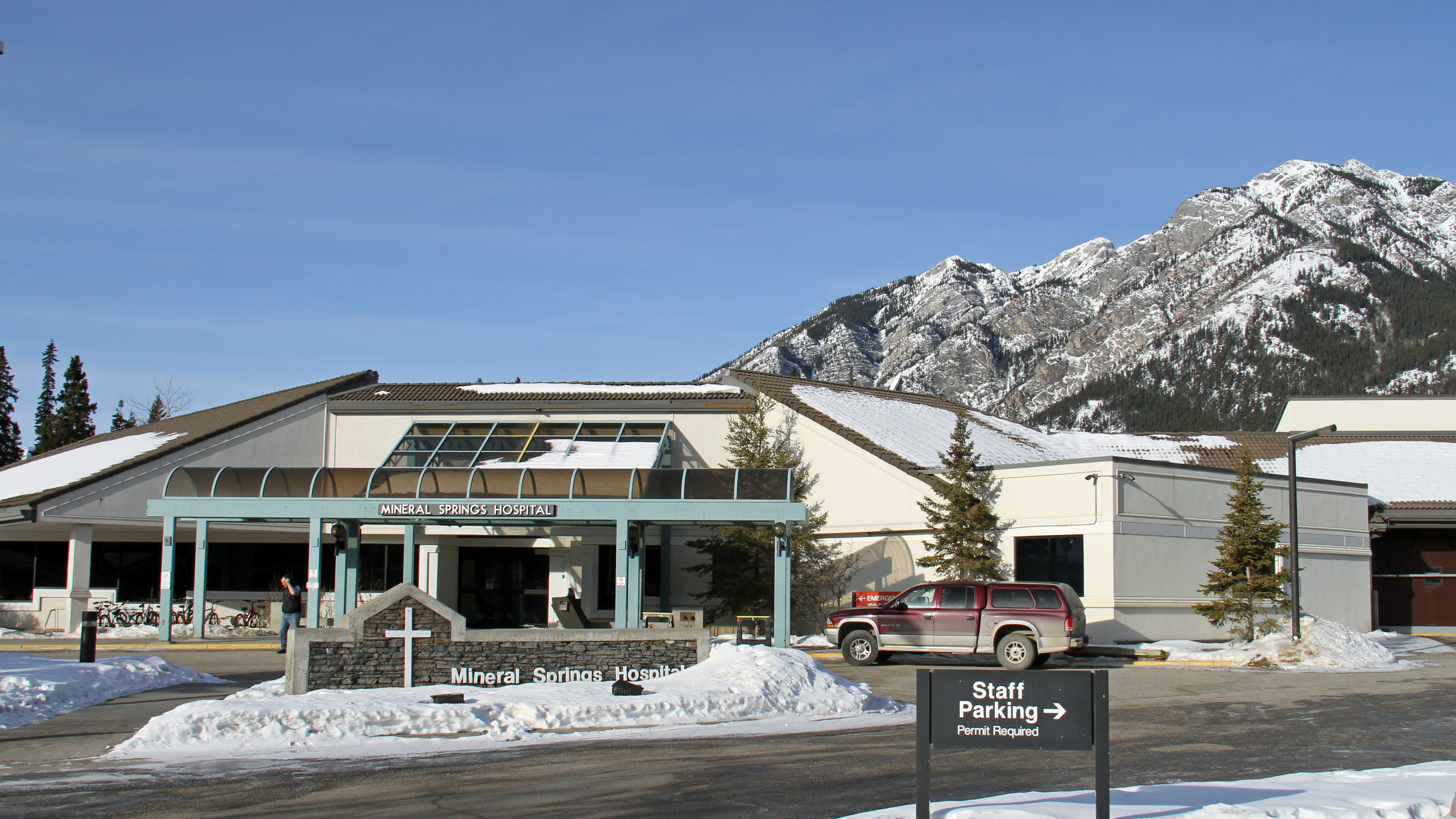
- Hospital main entrance

- Location in Alberta

Geography
- Location: 305 Lynx Street, Banff, Alberta, Canada
- Coordinates: 51°10′41″N 115°34′19″W

Organization
- Care system: Public Medicare (Canada)
- Type: General

Services
- Emergency department: Yes
- Beds: 24

Helipads
- Helipad: TC LID: CBM7

Links
- Website: www.covenanthealth.ca/hospitals-care-centres/banff-mineral-springs-hospital/
- Lists: Hospitals in Canada

Banff Mineral Springs Hospital is a medical facility located in Banff, Alberta, Canada. It is operated by Covenant Health.

The hospital is home to St. Martha's Place, a continuing care center which provides care to 25 people.

== Services ==
The hospital's services include:

- 24 acute-care beds
- Emergency healthcare
- Orthopedic
- Plastic and vascular surgery
- X-rays
- Laboratory
- Continuing care unit for residential care
- Pre-hospital care
- Clinical and non-clinical support
