= Stevenson Memorial Hospital =

Hospital in Alliston, Ontario, Canada

- Stevenson Memorial Hospital

Geography
- Location: 200 Fletcher Cres., Alliston, Ontario, Canada
- Coordinates: 44.155356°N 79.875561°W

Organization
- Care system: Medicare
- Type: Community

Services
- Beds: 41

History
- Founded: 1928

Links
- Website: www.stevensonhospital.ca
- Lists: Hospitals in Canada

Stevenson Memorial Hospital is located in the New Tecumseth community of Alliston, Ontario. The hospital is considered a medium-size community hospital with 41 in-patient beds and many outpatient services. in the 2019-2020 fiscal year there were 2,627 inpatient stays with an average length of stay of 4.2 days, and 35,500 emergency department visits.

T.P. Loblaw donated the funds to create the hospital in 1928 as a tribute to his grandparents, William and Elizabeth Stevenson. The hospital was led by CEO Jody Levac who announced retirement in March of 2023.He held the role for over 11 years. The Board and CEO balanced the budget 9 of his 11 years. Jody is the third CEO to come from Southlake Regional Health Center through a management services agreement. Gary Ryan and Annette Jones served as CEO derived from the relationship with Southlake as the hospital was placed in Supervision. A legacy fund was established by many community activists on Dr Levac's behalf for his tenure and work towards redevelopment of the hospital

The hospital Board in August 2018 completed an Executive Compensation framework and now directly employs the CEO role. The hospital is fully accredited and has some of the highest patient satisfaction scores for maternity in the province. It also has one of the fastest Emergency pay for performance records under Levac's tenure. The hospital is in the planning stage of a future expansion. The hospital provides care and treats patients from New Tecumseth, Adjala-Tosorontio, CFB Borden & Essa Township. The hospital also provides care and treatment to residents from a portion of Dufferin County.

== 2024 Appointment of Supervisor ==
In February 2024, Janice Skot the former CEO of the Royal Victoria Regional Health Centre was appointed as investigator by the Ministry of Health to investigate areas of governance, leadership, patient safety, and culture. Although the clarity and rationale of the report changed over time. Ms Skot was questioned by Board and administration for a conflict of interest role in the review. Staff fully participated but the results were questioned by those who participated. Community and staff saw the report as "heavy handed" and unnecessary. As a result of the 77-page report, Eric Hanna was appointed as the hospital's Supervisor under the Public Hospitals Act by the Lieutenant Governor in Council. He left at 6 months with no integration with a larger hospital established. Over time, many of the initial recommandations for larger integration have been rejected and original independent governance structure re-established with the oversight of Carmine Stumpo. The hospital continues to struggle with a growing 6.1 million dollar operational debt and proper MOH funding. It struggles to recruit staff and to find stability in leadership. Deepak Sharma is the newest CEO with a newly appointed senior leadership team.

== Patient services ==
- Acute Care
- Birthing Suite
- Day Surgery
- Diagnostic Imaging
- Emergency
- Laboratory
- Mental Health Services
- Outpatient Clinics
- Pharmacy
- Physiotherapy Services

== Helipad ==
A ground level helipad is located to the south of the water tower and requires ambulance transfer to get to the hospital's emergency department.
