= Royal Inland Hospital =

Royal Inland Hospital (RIH)
- Interior Health
- RIH from Columbia St and 3rd Ave

- Location in British Columbia

Geography
- Location: Kamloops, British Columbia, Canada
- Coordinates: 50°40′08″N 120°19′56″W

Organization
- Care system: Medicare
- Type: General, Teaching
- Affiliated university: UBC Faculty of Medicine Thompson Rivers University

Services
- Emergency department: Level II Trauma Centre
- Beds: 224

Helipads
- Helipad: TC LID: CBC4

History
- Founded: 1885

Links
- Website: www.interiorhealth.ca/locations/royal-inland-hospital

Royal Inland Hospital is a medical facility located in Kamloops, British Columbia serving a catchment area of 225,000 km^{2}.

== About ==
Interior Health Authority is responsible for the operations of the hospital. It is the publicly funded healthcare provider in the Southern Interior region of the Province.

Royal Inland Hospital (RIH) is a 254-bed tertiary acute care hospital located in Kamloops, BC. It is the only tertiary acute care facility in the Thompson Cariboo Shuswap area and it is the one of only two tertiary care centres in Interior Health (IHA). As the primary referral centre for the area, it offers a broad range of medical and surgical services. RIH emergency department is recognized for its ability to respond to a number of large and complex traumas annually and for its efficiency in serving needs and demands of a large geographic area.

== Services ==
- Diagnostic imaging (CT, MRI and Ultrasound)
- Emergency
- Inpatient Care (Family Medicine, Internal Medicine, Neurology, Palliative Care, Pediatrics)
- Psychiatry / Mental health
- Secondary and Tertiary Prevention (Diabetes Clinic)
- Surgery (General, Neurosurgery, Orthopedics, Plastics, Urology, Vascular)

== Statistics ==
In the 2022 year:

- 67,012 patients were assessed in the emergency department
  - 13.2% of these required hospital admission.
- 12,356 total inpatient visits
- 3,998 inpatient surgical cases
- 20,835 surgical day care cases.

== Architecture ==
=== Main Building ===
The structure now referred to as the Main Building consists of several buildings constructed in different phases. These include a nine storey South tower (1962), one storey West wing (1977), two storey East wing (1977), eight storey North tower (1980) and four storey Northest wing (1988). It houses the emergency department, inpatient units, radiology, inpatient lab, pathology, cancer clinic and dialysis unit.

=== Phil and Jennie Gaglardi Tower ===
Opened in 2022, the Phil and Jennie Gaglardi Tower houses patient registration, pediatric mental health, operating suites and inpatient beds. It has a rooftop helipad which allowed for the closure of the prior adjacent helipad that had been constructed in 2012. The building is named after local politician and philanthropist Phil Gaglardi.

=== Clinical Services Building (CSB) ===
The CSB was opened in 2016. It includes ambulatory outpatient services such as pre-surgical, orthopedic and respiratory clinics as well as the outpatient laboratory. It also houses the Kamloops Urgent Primary Care and Learning Centre (UPCC). Additionally, it provides space for the UBC medical school and family medicine residency programs. The building also features 350 covered parking stalls. It is connected to the main hospital by an elevated walkway.

=== Alumnae Tower ===
The 6 storey alumni tower was constructed in 1965. It was constructed as a nursing residence and school. Currently it houses the maternity, asthma, children's health and diabetes education clinics and functions as a student residence.

=== Hillside Centre ===
Constructed in 2006, Hillside Centre contains 47 beds for acute adult tertiary mental health cares. With the provincial Tertiary Neuropsychiatry Programs, it provides intensive mental health services and recovery oriented rehabilitation for patients from throughout the southern interior of BC, working collaboratively with community partners throughout the region as a part of the tertiary mental health system for the Interior Health Authority. Care is provided by a multidisciplinary team in a residential setting providing longer term stabilization and recovery oriented care for its clients. South Hills has 40 beds, with each of two psychiatrists and social workers covering 20 of those beds. The tertiary psychiatric team in Kamloops consists of 7 psychiatrists who collaborates as necessary for the quality of services. They extend their services in Community Mental Health such as Geriatric and Addictions work.

== Educational services ==
The hospital serves as a training centre for multiple professions. Nursing students from Thompson Rivers University (TRU) train at this site. Respiratory therapy students from TRU may do their practicum at Royal Inland. The hospital also serves as a site for rotating pharmacy residents. In 2014 the hospital became a hub for a family medicine residency training program. The hospital serves as an emergency medicine training site for the CCFP(EM) and Kamloops Emergency Education Program (KEEP) for rural practitioners.

== History ==
- 1885 - Constructed with 12 beds
- 1891 - Renovated to 15 beds
- 1886 - Woman's ward
- 1905 - Trafalgar Wing added
- 1910 - Opening of Columbia Street 128 bed hospital
- 1925 - Addition of medical laboratory
- 1947 - West Wing and East Wing added
- 1965 - Nine story tower built
- 1981 - North tower built
- 1988 - West tower built
- 2006 - Expansion of ER, radiology, orthopedic clinic and preadmission clinic.
- 2006 - Hillside Psychiatric Centre opened
