= Covenant Health (Alberta) =

Catholic health care provider in Canada

- Formation: October 7, 2008; 17 years ago
- Region served: Alberta
- Board chair: Ed Stelmach
- Staff: 11,076 (2021)
- Website: covenanthealth.ca

Covenant Health is a Catholic health care provider that serves the Canadian province of Alberta. It was established on October 7, 2008, by Patrick Dumelie, following the amalgamation of Alberta's regional Catholic health care providers under a single administration.

The organization is governed by a board of directors that consists of 11 individuals, who are appointed by, and accountable to, the Catholic Bishops of Alberta, which itself includes 5 Latin bishops and 1 Ukrainian Catholic bishop. The board has been chaired by former Alberta premier Ed Stelmach since 2016.

According to Covenant Health, it is one of the largest Catholic health care providers in Canada, employing over 11,000 staff, physicians and volunteers in 16 facilities in 11 communities across Alberta in cooperation with Alberta Health Services. Services provided include acute care, continuing care, assisted living, hospice, rehabilitation, ambulance services, respite care, and seniors' housing.

On 17 August 2024, Premier Danielle Smith announced that one of the changes to Alberta health care, as part of the restructuring process, would be to turn hospitals currently operated by Alberta Health Services, over to providers such as Covenant Health.

== Covenant Health sites ==
Facility Name	Location	Coordinates
Banff - Mineral Springs Hospital	Banff	51°10′47″N 115°34′34″W
Bonnyville Health Centre	Bonnyville	54°15′51″N 110°44′26″W
Edmonton General Continuing Care Centre	Edmonton Metropolitan Region	
Grey Nuns Community Hospital	Edmonton Metropolitan Region	53°27′39″N 113°25′42″W
Killam Health Centre	Killam	52°47′15″N 111°51′35″W
Martha's House	Lethbridge	
Mary Immaculate Hospital	Mundare	
Misericordia Community Hospital	Edmonton Metropolitan Region	53°31′13″N 113°36′39″W
Our Lady of the Rosary Hospital	Castor	52°13′24″N 111°54′24″W
St Joseph's Auxiliary Hospital	Edmonton Metropolitan Region	53°27′35″N 113°30′22″W
St. Joseph's General Hospital	Vegreville	53°29′38″N 112°01′57″W
St. Mary's Health Centre	Trochu	51°49′11″N 113°13′36″W
St. Mary's Hospital	Camrose	53°00′54″N 112°49′49″W
St. Michael's Health Centre	Lethbridge	49°41′09″N 112°48′56″W
St. Therese Villa	Lethbridge	
Youville Home	St. Albert	
Villa Caritas Geriatric Psychiatry	Edmonton	
