= Interior Health =

Regional health authority for Interior British Columbia

- Abbreviation: IH
- Formation: 2001; 25 years ago
- Type: GO
- Headquarters: 505 Doyle Avenue; Kelowna, British Columbia; V1Y 0C5
- Region served: British Columbia Interior
- Services: Health care
- CEO: Sylvia Weir
- Budget: $2.6 billion (2020/21)
- Staff: 21,000 staff; 1,900 physicians; 4,800 volunteers
- Website: www.interiorhealth.ca

Interior Health is a regional health authority in British Columbia. It is one of the five publicly-funded regional health authorities, serving the southern Interior region of British Columbia.

== Facilities ==
As of 2020 Interior Health operates 16 community hospitals, 4 regional hospitals, 2 tertiary hospitals and 22 health care centers, including:

- 100 Mile District General Hospital
- Arrow Lakes Hospital
- Ashcroft Hospital and Community Health Care Centre
- Boundary District Hospital, Grand Forks
- Cariboo Memorial Hospital, Williams Lake
- Creston Valley Hospital & Health Centre
- Dr. Helmcken Memorial Hospital, Clearwater
- East Kootenay Regional Hospital, Cranbrook
- Elk Valley Hospital, Fernie
- Golden & District Hospital
- Invermere & District Hospital
- Kelowna General Hospital
- Kootenay Boundary Regional Hospital, Trail
- Kootenay Lake Hospital, Nelson
- Lillooet Hospital & Health Centre
- Nicola Valley Hospital and Health Centre, Merritt
- Penticton Regional Hospital
- Princeton General Hospital
- Queen Victoria Hospital, Revelstoke
- Royal Inland Hospital, Kamloops
- Shuswap Lake General Hospital, Salmon Arm
- South Okanagan General Hospital and Oliver Health Centre
- Summerland Health Centre
- Vernon Jubilee Hospital

== Activities ==
Interior Health received a $195,814 grant from the Public Health Agency of Canada's Immunization Partnership fund to implement an automated electronic reminder system for vaccination appointments across the region.

== Health Information Exchange ==
Interior Health provides services across a broad region that includes many rural and remote communities, where access to timely clinical information is an important factor in care delivery. To support continuity of care across diverse settings, the authority participates in provincial health information exchange initiatives such as CareConnect, British Columbia’s centralized Electronic Health Record (EHR). CareConnect allows authorized providers to access consolidated health data, including laboratory results, diagnostic imaging, and hospital visits.

Interior Health also uses the Clinical Data Exchange (CDX) Service to securely share clinical documents between health authorities and community-based Electronic Medical Record (EMR) systems. This includes systems such as Ava EMR and Wolf EMR, which are used in primary care settings across the province.

These systems help facilitate coordinated care, particularly in areas where geographic barriers can limit access to centralized services.

== Awards ==
Since the start of Thompson Rivers University (TRU) nursing program in 1974 and its respiratory therapy program Interior Health and Royal Inland Hospital have contributed to the expansion and growth of health education programs at TRU by helping students obtain their education practice requirements. Thus, TRU awarded Interior Health authority as with the 2010 Distinguished Alumni: Service to the Community Award.
