= North Bay Regional Health Centre =

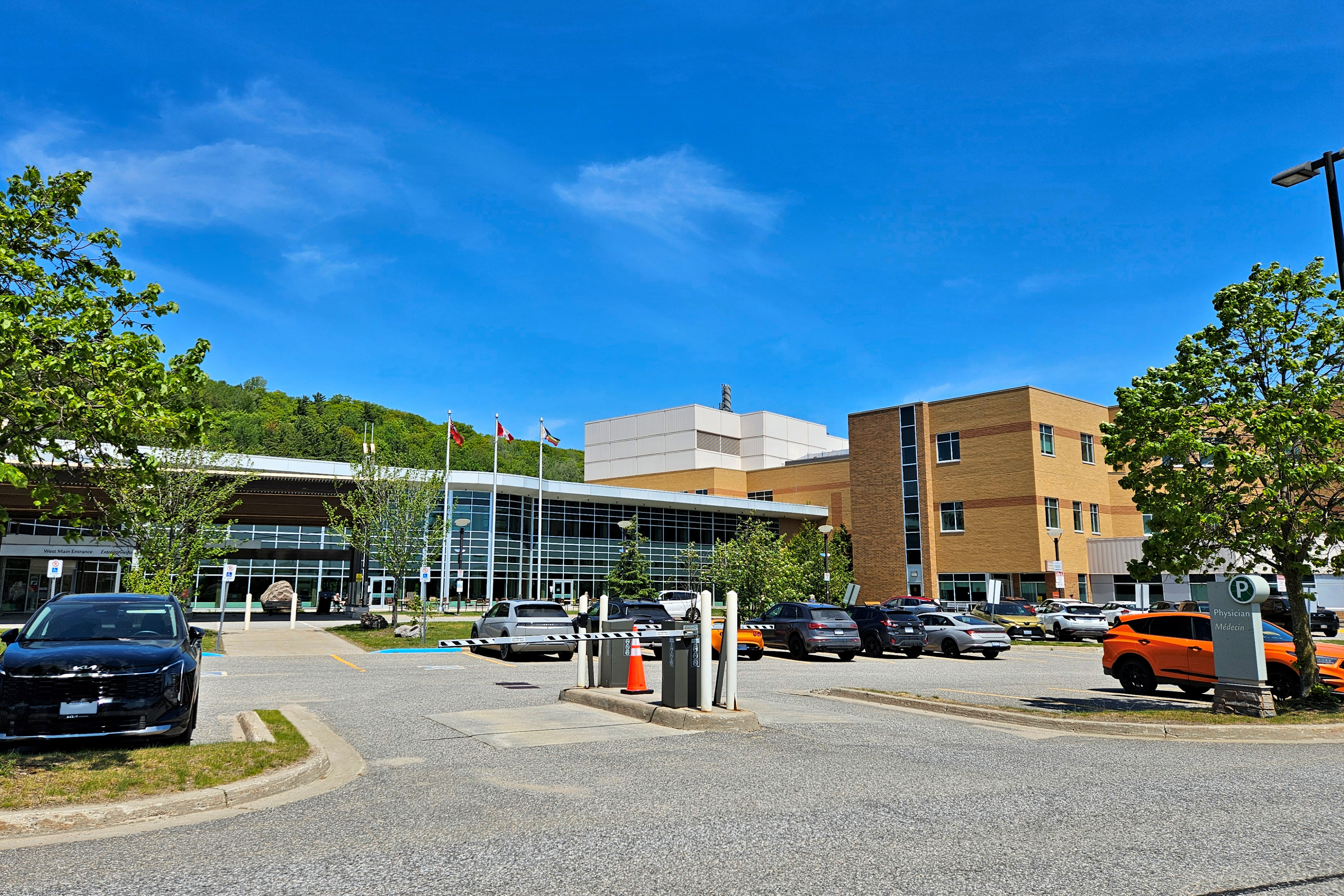
- Interactive map of the North Bay Regional Health Centre area

General information
- Location: 50 College Drive, North Bay, Ontario, Canada
- Coordinates: 46°20′8″N 79°29′54″W
- Completed: Completed 2011

Technical details
- Floor area: 70,171 m^{3} (2,478,100 cu ft)

Design and construction
- Architect: Evans Bertrand Wheeler Architects Inc.
- Structural engineer: Halsall Engineers-Consultants
- Civil engineer: Northland Engineering Limited

Other information
- Facilities: North Bay General Hospital (NBGH) & Northeast Mental Health Centre (NEMHC)

Website
- https://nbrhc.on.ca/

The North Bay Regional Health Centre (NBRHC) is a medical facility located on a 32 acres (13 ha) site off of Highway 17 in North Bay, Ontario, Canada, consisting of two main buildings which cover 70,171 m^{2} (755,310 sq ft) of the site. The 3-story District Hospital occupies 275 acute care beds while the 2-story Regional Mental Health Centre contains 113 beds. The main circulation hall, known as "Main Street," runs along the entire length of the hospital and acts as a link between facilities.

In addition to the main campus, the hospital also utilizes Kirkwood Place, a satellite site located in Sudbury. This four story facility is utilized by the NBRHC (first three stories) and Health Sciences North for regional mental health services for adults and seniors. It provides both outpatient services and inpatient care.

A third facility is located in downtown North Bay and includes the Nipissing Detoxification and Substance Abuse Program and mental health clinics. The 2,185 m^{2} (23,520 sq ft) facility provides 29 residential treatment beds and 10 flex bed. Attached to this complex is a second, 3-storey, 870 m^{2} (9,400 sq ft) facility which services outpatient mental health services.

== Services ==
A variety of services and programs exist at the facility, being one of the regional referral centres for North-Eastern Ontario:

- Critical care medicine
- Emergency medicine and ambulatory care
- Integrated stroke unit and rehabilitation
- Surgical services, including:
  - General surgery
  - Orthopaedics and regional joint assessment and replacement clinic
  - Urology
  - Ophthalmology
  - Obstetrics and gynecology
  - Otolaringology (ENT)
- Pediatrics including inpatient care and neonatology
- Diagnostic imaging
  - Diagnostic imaging
  - Laboratory services
  - Magnetic resonance imaging (MRI)
  - CT scan (formerly CAT scan) or X-ray computed tomography
  - Ultrasound
  - Mammography
- Pathology
- Addictions and mental health
  - Seniors and rural outreach
  - Pediatric psychiatry
  - Eating disorders
  - Rapid access addictions medicine
  - General psychiatry and electroconvulsive therapy
  - Counselling and treatment
  - Crisis services
  - Regional forensic psychiatry unit
- Cardiopulmonary services
- Outpatient stroke rehabilitation

== Architecture ==
The North Bay Regional Health Centre was designed by local architectural firm Evans Bertrand Hill Wheeler Architecture, with Brian Bertrand assigned to the project as lead architect. This facility combined three former and separate sites of the North Bay Civic Hospital, the St. Joseph's General Hospital North Bay, and the Northeast Mental Health Centre.

During initial design discussions for the facility, redesigning and modernizing the former St. Joseph's General Hospital was discussed. The cost of a redesign on this scale, however, would have been equivalent, or higher, than designing and building an entirely new structure. Of the 28 potential new locations considered, 50 College Drive was considered to offer ease of access for patients, a natural surrounding, and room for further development. Once the location was confirmed, the design process began and construction crews broke ground on March 24, 2007.

== Design objectives ==
Several design principles were adopted for the NBRHC, however, the patient's point of view was prioritized. The majority of the patient rooms have windows looking onto a central courtyard or with views of the forested back or the large Lake Nipissing. Other "control" features such as control over lighting and food were included. The hospital's "pod" design facilitates way finding throughout the facility for outpatient appointments and visitors.

Another major component in the design was to provide patients with a connection to nature, as part of the biophilic design, this one considers how the users are connected with nature as its main design aspect. Evans Bertrand Hill Wheeler Architecture wanted to provide an appropriate amount of space for staff members to efficiently work, while also providing a connection for the patients with the surrounding natural environment. In order to achieve this, gardens, greenhouses, sweat lodges, and a spiritual labyrinth were added.

== Innovations ==
As part of the B-2 Occupancy Code, which includes any health care related unit, the NBRHC is the first hospital in Ontario to incorporate wood into its design. By doing so the firm was rewarded three Wood WORKS! awards in 2010. Additionally, a Heat Exchange Unit was implemented to provide fresh air into every room while recovering heat when the exterior temperature is low. As part of the stress-free environment, most patients' rooms are facing south, large windows are strategically placed to allow the sun's rays to reach the patient's bed.

The architecture team, along with the hospital administrators, aimed to reduce the impact on the environment and communities that surrounds the NBRHC by making the hospital as environmentally friendly (green) as possible. Therefore, reducing the energy that is consumed to operate the hospital, improving the air quality within and extending the overall life of the building made the NBRHC LEED certified. Consequently, the cost reduction for electrical and mechanical equipment was reduced by $825,000. Additionally, the green design resulted in a reduction of 1,890 tons of greenhouse gas emissions annually. Further, the hospital has two supplementary fuel sources: cogeneration and biomass, which can heat and power the hospital when maximum patient capacity is reached. The use of biomass is manifested through the hospital's sustainable strategy, since this one uses slash to produce heat and electricity, which is wood debris leftover from logging.
