= Penticton Regional Hospital =

- Interior Health

Geography
- Location: 550 Carmi Avenue; Penticton, British Columbia, Canada
- Coordinates: 49°28′55″N 119°34′41″W

Organization
- Care system: Interior Health
- Type: General
- Affiliated university: UBC Faculty of Medicine

Services
- Emergency department: Yes
- Beds: 140

Helipads
- Helipad: TC LID: CPH6
Number	Length		Surface
Number	ft	m	Surface
1	86 x 86	26 × 26	Concrete

History
- Founded: 1913

Links
- Website: www.interiorhealth.ca/locations/penticton-regional-hospital
- Lists: Hospitals in Canada

Penticton Regional Hospital (PRH) is a 140-bed hospital located in Penticton, British Columbia. It is operated by Interior Health and affiliated with UBC Faculty of Medicine. Penticton Regional Hospital was incorporated in 1913.

== History ==
In 2019, a new hospital tower was opened as part of the first phase of a $320 million upgrade to the facility.
