= Kelowna General Hospital =

- Interior Health
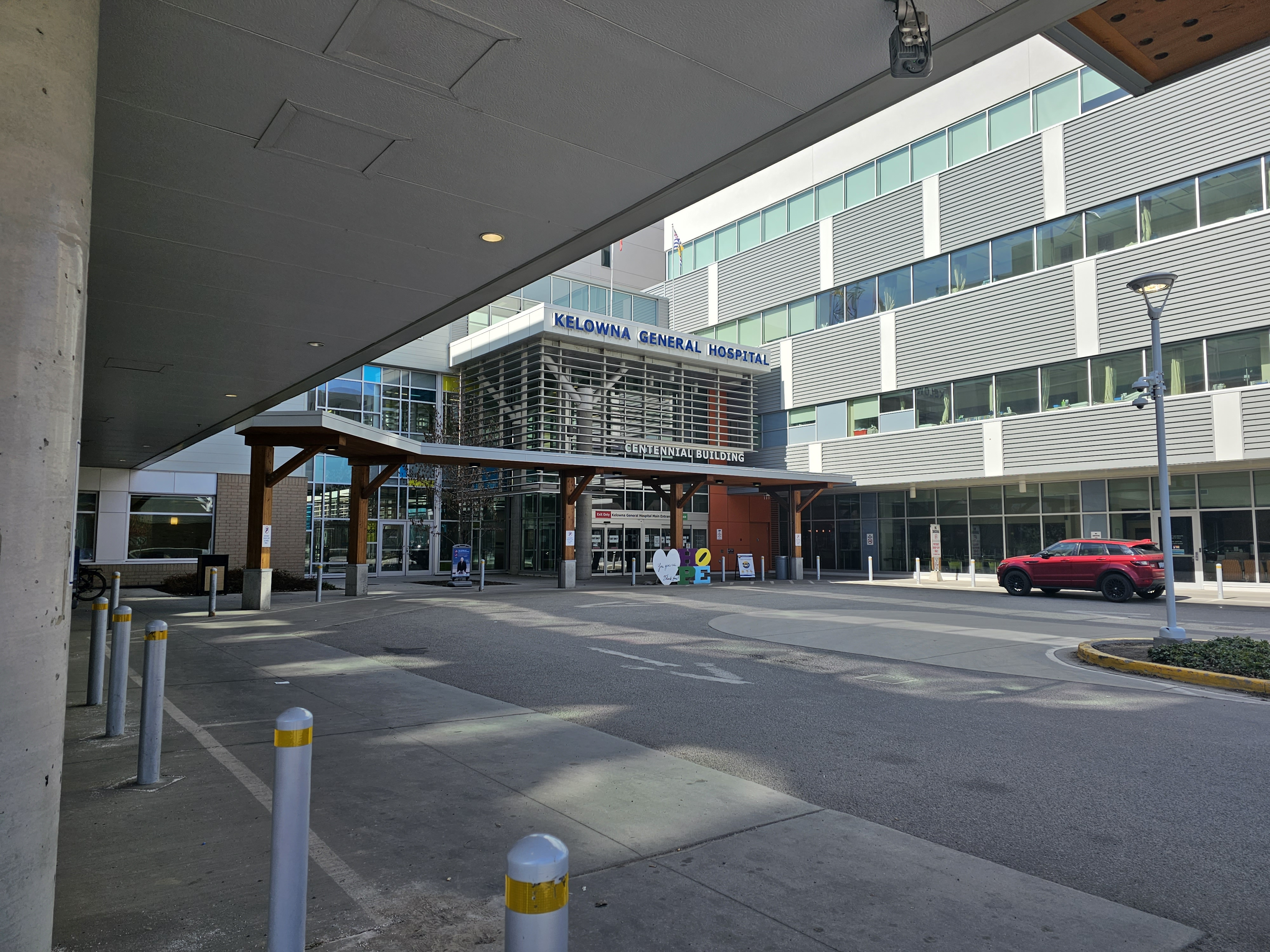
- Centennial Building entrance to Kelowna General Hospital

- Location in British Columbia

Geography
- Location: 2268 Pandosy Street; Kelowna, British Columbia, Canada; V1Y 1T2
- Coordinates: 49°52′23″N 119°29′39″W

Organisation
- Care system: Interior Health
- Type: General, teaching
- Affiliated university: UBC Faculty of Medicine and UBC Okanagan School of Nursing

Services
- Emergency department: Yes
- Beds: 440

Helipads
- Helipad: TC LID: CKH9

History
- Founded: 1908

Links
- Website: www.interiorhealth.ca/locations/kelowna-general-hospital

Kelowna General Hospital (KGH) is a tertiary referral hospital located in Kelowna, British Columbia operated by Interior Health that offers medical care in the Central Okanagan. In British Columbia, Kelowna General is the only hospital outside the Lower Mainland or Vancouver Island that performs angioplasty or cardiac surgery.

== History ==
Kelowna General Hospital originally opened on August 2, 1908, with 19 beds on the land that was donated by Kelowna Land & Orchard Company. This building remained until 1940 when a new hospital building was constructed. In 1969, the five-storey Strathcona building was constructed, followed by the five-storey Royal Building in 1992. Construction of the new six-storey Centennial Tower began in 2008, part of an $800 million capital investment in health care for the Central and North Okanagan since 2007. It was completed on May 27, 2012.

=== 2007 hospital expansion ===
Plans to expand Kelowna General Hospital were approved in 2007 to support growing population in the region.

- Various facilities upgrade and modernization
- 34,000 square foot Clinical Academic Campus Building, affiliated with the University of British Columbia Medical School.
- Six-storey 187,000 square feet (17,400 m^{2}) Centennial Patient Care Tower with new rooftop helipad and 30,000 square feet (2,800 m^{2}) emergency department is now complete.
- Three-storey 84,470 square feet (7,848 m^{2}) East Pandosy Clinical Support Building
- The main floor of the Royal Building, including the main lobby, the old Emergency Department, the old Ambulatory Care Centre, and the Patient Registration area, was converted into a new Cardiac Catheterization Lab. The renovations were finished in 2017.

=== Interior Heart and Surgical Centre ===
Construction on the East Pandosy Building began in Feb. 11, 2011. The aim was to bring lab and clinical support services under one roof. The East Pandosy Building supported the Interior Heart and Surgical Centre (IHSC) Project by allowing the relocation of existing hospital departments for construction to start on the IHSC building.

The 72-year-old Pandosy Building was demolished in the summer of 2012 to make way for a cardiac clinic. Construction began in the summer of 2012 and opened for patient care on September 28, 2015. The 4th floor where a new perinatal (maternity) unit is housed opened in March 2016.

The 139,590 square feet Interior Heart and Surgical Centre (IHSC) was officially opened in mid-2015. With 15 operating rooms, it is now allowing heart surgeries to take place in the interior of BC for the first time. It is the province's fifth cardiac critical care center.
