= Royal Victoria Regional Health Centre =

- Location in Ontario

Geography
- Location: 201 Georgian Drive, Barrie, Ontario, Canada
- Coordinates: 44.4140°N 79.6612°W

Organization
- Care system: Medicare (Canada)
- Type: General
- Affiliated university: University of Toronto

Services
- Beds: 319

Helipads
- Helipad: TC LID: CRV2

History
- Former name: Barrie General Hospital; Royal Victoria Hospital
- Founded: 1891

Links
- Website: www.rvh.on.ca
- Lists: Hospitals in Canada

The Royal Victoria Regional Health Centre (formerly the Royal Victoria Hospital) is a Level III trauma centre with enhanced district stroke designation, serving the needs of the population of the City of Barrie and the surrounding area. The facility is located at 201 Georgian Drive in Barrie, Ontario, Canada. The CEO is Gail Hunt. As of 2017, the hospital operated on a $340 million annual budget.

The Royal Victoria Regional Health Centre is a 299-bed acute care facility. With a team of over 380 physicians, 2,500 staff members and 850 volunteers, the RVH provides healthcare specializing in cancer care, surgical services, critical care, mental health rehabilitation services, as well as women and children's programs.

The Royal Victoria Regional Health Centre is the only hospital in Barrie and is the regional hospital for a large geographical region including central Simcoe County Barrie, Innisfil (Alcona, Stroud, Gilford), Springwater (Elmvale, Midhurst, Minesing, Snow Valley), south Oro- Medonte (Horseshoe Valley, Shanty Bay), a small portion of Essa Township (Ivy, Thornton).

== History ==
Previous logo

The hospital dates to 1891, when it was known as the Barrie General Hospital, which was located in a home at 105 Duckworth Street near Ardagh's Grove. The facility has relocated and expanded many times since its inception:

- 1897 Barrie General Hospital relocated to 63 High Street to R.E. Fletcher House and becomes Royal Victoria Hospital (RVH) in honour of Queen Victoria's Diamond Jubilee (since demolished)
- 1903 RVH relocated to purpose-built site at 76 Ross Street
- 1910-1911 Strathy Wing built
- 1952 Memorial Wing opened
- 1962-1963 Ross Street expansion (original 1903 and 1911 Strathy wing demolished)
- 1997 current site completed and old RVH repurposed as Victoria Village Seniors Retirement Community)

== Facilities ==
The number of beds is broken down as follows

- 21 Critical Care beds
- 36 Mental Health beds
- 8 child and youth mental health beds
- 170 General Medical/Surgical beds
- 22 Obstetrical beds
- 8 Paediatric beds
- 14 Rehabilitation beds
- 70 field hospital beds in the Regional Pandemic Response Unit
- Advanced Level II Special Care Nursery

There are in excess of 85,000 visits to the Emergency Department, annually. RVH has 2,000 births each year. Since opening in 1997, activities across the board have virtually doubled.

The helipad for the hospital is found at ground level across from Georgian College Residences and requires ambulance transfer to the hospital's emergency department.

== Expansion ==
In 2009, Royal Victoria Hospital embarked on the largest capital project in its history. The expansion program was broken into Phase 1 and Phase 2. Construction of the main phase was concluded in the spring of 2012.

=== Phase 1 ===
Phase one included a $450 million redevelopment and expansion project that almost doubled the size of the hospital, adding 400,000 square feet (37,000 m^{2}) of space, and capacity for 165 additional inpatient beds, including a dedicated Coronary Care Unit; significant expansions of the Emergency Department, Diagnostic Imaging and Laboratory and two additional Operating Rooms. In addition to the significant expansion, another 100,000 square feet (9,300 m^{2}) of the current facility received renovations.

The main features of the Phase 1 expansion included:

- The Simcoe Muskoka Regional Cancer Centre, which will log more than 65,000 patient visits in its first year
- 165 new inpatient beds, including a dedicated Coronary Care Unit for critically ill cardiac patients
- An Emergency Department that will triple in size and includes trauma, isolation areas, a clinical decision unit and mental health suite.
- An expanded Diagnostic Imaging Department will double in size to increase patient flow and privacy
- An expanded Laboratory
- Two new Operating Rooms which are larger than existing suites for complex surgeries
- Expansion space for two future patient care units
- "Rotary House", a residential lodge for cancer patients and their families who live more than 40 kilometers outside Barrie.

=== Phase 2 ===
As Phase 1 nears completion, Phase 2 was to begin. Phase 2 was planned to consist of significant renovations to the existing hospital, including construction of new operating rooms, more patient beds, construction/update to the special care nursery (neonatal unit) and an expansion to the surgical unit.

=== Phase 3 ===
Phase 3 involves the building of a nine-story patient care tower.

=== Innisfil Phase 1 ===
Plans were announced in 2021 to build a second campus in nearby Innisfil, Ontario.

== Regional Pandemic Response Unit ==
In response to the COVID-19 pandemic, the Regional Pandemic Response Unit (PRU) was built, opening on November 27, 2020. The PRU was erected in the hospital parking lot. Although it has a tent-like appearance, it is suitable for any kind of weather, and is equipped with appropriate heating and cooling units.

This fully-functioning, 70-bed field hospital is not intended to directly care for COVID-19 patients, but rather is meant to alleviate patient overflow challenges. As such, it is one of only three such sites in the province and allows RVH to assist overloaded zones like Toronto.

== Awards ==
1. Gold Quality Healthcare Workplace Award: Recognized by the Ontario Hospital Association for fostering a healthy and safe workplace.

== See also ==
- Royal eponyms in Canada
