= Kincardine and District General Hospital =

South Bruce Grey Health Centre –Kincardine
- South Bruce Grey Health Centre
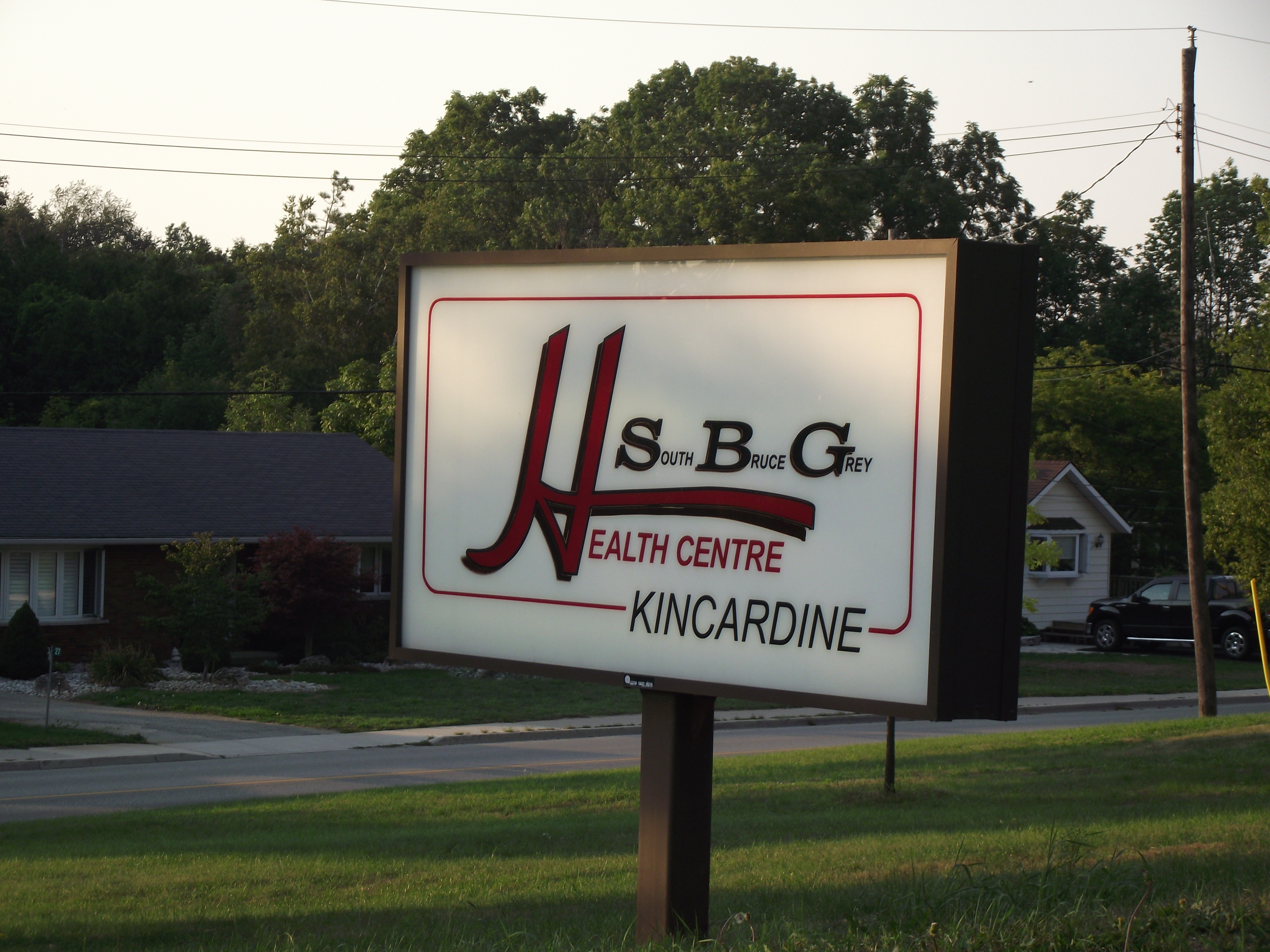

- Location in Ontario

Geography
- Location: Kincardine, Municipality of Kincardine, Ontario, Canada
- Coordinates: 44.18920°N 81.62539°W

Organization
- Care system: Public Medicare (Canada) (OHIP)
- Type: Community

Services
- Emergency department: Yes
- Beds: 17

Helipads
- Helipad: TC LID: CPU2

History
- Founded: 1908

Links
- Website: www.sbghc.on.ca
- Lists: Hospitals in Canada

South Bruce Grey Health Centre - Kincardine is a hospital in Kincardine, Ontario. It is part of the South Bruce Grey Health Centre.

== History ==
When the hospital first opened it held 11 beds. Many additions have occurred over the years, including in 1923, 1956, 1968, and 1982. Due to cut backs in health care, the hospital currently contains 17 beds.

== Facilities ==
- Emergency operating room
- Fracture room
- Decontamination room (for the local nuclear plant, Bruce Power)
- Laboratory
- Physiotherapy
- Radiology
- Electrocardiography

The hospital heliport is located to the southeast of the hospital and requires ambulance to travel from heliport to the interior of the building to get to the emergency department.

== The Kincardine Hospital Redevelopment Project ==
In August 2011 the Provincial Government of Ontario approved plans to completely remodel the whole hospital. The project will begin in 2015 with a total cost of an estimated $104 million(CDN). Update: In 2012 the approved plan to remodel the hospital were cancelled by the Ministry of Health and Long-Term Care.
