= Anand (name) =

- Pronunciation: [aːˈnənd̪]
- Gender: Male (name)
- Language: Several Indo-Aryan and Dravidian languages

Origin
- Origin: Sanskrit
- Meaning: Happiness or joy
- Region of origin: India

Other names
- Alternative spelling: Ananda
- Variant forms: Annand, Aanand

Anand (pronounced [aːˈnənd̪]) is a name as well as a surname of Indian Hindu origin, derived from the Sanskrit abstract noun आनन्द (ānanda), which means happiness or joy.. Some Anand surname people belong to the Khukhrain clan among Kshatriya caste mostly found in Haryana and Punjab, while some Anand surname people belong to Kashmiri Brahmin caste mostly found in Kashmir.

== People with the surname Anand ==
=== Engineers and scientists ===
- Anuranjan Anand (born 1965), Indian geneticist
- Ashima Anand (born 1950), Indian doctor
- B. K. Anand (1917–2007), Indian physiologist and pharmacologist
- Lallit Anand (born 1948), American mechanical engineer and professor
- Nitya Anand (1925–2024), Indian medicinal chemist
- Santokh Singh Anand (1909–1996), Indian surgeon
- Sonia Anand (born 1968), Canadian medical researcher

=== Sports ===
- Amrik Anand (born 1947), Indian cricketer
- Chetan Anand (badminton) (born 1980), Indian badminton player
- Jagrit Anand (born 1989), Indian cricketer
- Roshan Lal Anand (1924–2024), Indian sports administrator
- Subramanian Anand (born 1986), Sri Lankan cricketer
- Viswanathan Anand (born 1969), Indian chess player

=== Entertainment ===
- A. V. Anand (born 1936), Indian musician
- Akshay Anand, Indian actor
- Ambika Anand (born 1980), Indian television anchor and editor
- Anand Raj Anand (born 1962), Indian music director, composer, lyricist and playback singer
- Anita Anand (born 1972), British radio and television presenter and journalist
- Anjali Anand (born 1992), Indian actress
- Ayush Anand, Indian actor
- Chandan K Anand (born 1980), Indian actor
- Chetan Anand (director) (1921–1997), Indian producer, screenwriter, and director; member of the Anand family
- Dev Anand (1923–2011), Indian actor, writer, director, and producer; member of the Anand family
- Inder Raj Anand (died 1987), Indian film writer
- J. C. Anand (1922–1977), Pakistani filmmaker
- K. V. Anand (1966–2021), Indian cinematographer, film director and photo journalist
- Karan Aanand, Indian actor and producer
- Ketan Anand, Indian director
- Mahesh Anand (1961–2019), Indian actor, dancer and martial artist
- Mayank Anand (born 1979), Indian actor, artist, author and director
- Mukul S. Anand (1951–1997), Indian film director and producer
- Nikita Anand (born 1983), Indian model, actress and beauty queen
- Priya Anand (born 1986), Indian film actress and model
- Santosh Anand (born 1929), Indian lyricist
- Shakti Anand (born 1975), Indian television actor
- Shilpa Anand (born 1982), Indian model, television and movie actress
- Shoma Anand (born 1958), Indian television and film actress
- Siddharth Anand (born 1978), Indian film director
- Suneil Anand (born 1956), Indian film actor
- Suparna Anand (born 1969), Indian film actress
- Tinnu Anand (born 1945), Indian actor and director
- Uma Anand (1923–2009), Indian journalist and actress
- Veebha Anand (born 1996), Indian television actress
- Vijay Anand (filmmaker) (1934–2004), Indian filmmaker, producer, screenwriter, editor, and actor; member of the Anand family
- Vikas Anand, Indian actor
- Vinay Anand, Indian actor
- Vishal Anand (died 2020), Indian actor and producer
- Yashika Aannand (born 1999), Indian actress and model

=== Politics ===
- Anita Anand (born 1967), Canadian lawyer and current Member of Parliament currently serving as Minister of Foreign Affairs
- Deepak Anand (born 1972), Canadian politician, MPP from Ontario
- Jagmohan Anand, Indian politician, Member of Haryana Legislative Assembly
- Pinky Anand, Indian lawyer and politician
- R. K. Anand (born 1943), Indian lawyer and parliamentarian
- Raaj Kumar Anand (born 1966), Indian politician and businessman
- Veena Anand, Indian politician
- Vijay Anand (politician) (born 1969), Indian politician

=== Others ===
- Adarsh Sein Anand (1936–2017), Indian Chief Justice of the Supreme Court
- Anjum Anand (born 1971), British Indian food writer and TV chef
- Anurag Anand (born 1978), Indian author
- Atul Anand, Indian admiral
- Bharat Anand, American economist and professor
- Channi Anand (born 1970), Indian photographer and journalist
- Gaggan Anand, Indian chef
- Geeta Anand, Indian-American journalist, professor and author
- Harjit Singh Anand (born 1948), Indian government administrator
- Jagjit Singh Anand (1921–2014), Indian community activist, journalist, author and freedom fighter
- Javed Anand (born c. 1950), Indian journalist and civil rights activist
- Jernail Singh Anand (born 1955), Indian poet, writer and environmental activist
- K. K. Anand (1930–2013), Indian management consultant
- Karen Anand, Indian food writer
- Lokesh Anand (born 1978), Indian musician
- Madhur Anand, Canadian poet and professor
- Margot Anand (born 1944), French author, teacher, seminar leader and public speaker
- Mulk Raj Anand (1905–2004), Indian writer
- R. P. Anand (1933–2011), Indian lawyer and legal scholar
- Rashmi Anand, Indian activist and writer
- Ruchi Anand, Indian international relations professor
- Satyapal Anand (1931–2025), Indian poet, critic and writer
- Thaminder Singh Anand (born 1957), American Sikh scholar
- Valerie Anand (1937–2024), pen name of Fiona Buckley, British author

== People with the given name Anand ==
=== Academics ===
- Anand Kumar (born 1973), Indian mathematician
- Anand Menon, United Kingdom professor
- Anand Mohan (born 1957), Indian academic
- Anand Rai (born 1977), Indian activist, medical officer and ophthalmologist

=== Business ===
- Anand Burman (born 1950s), Indian businessman
- Anand Jain (born 1957), Indian businessman
- Anand Lal Shimpi (born 1982), American businessman
- Anand Mahindra (born 1955), Indian businessman
- Anand Rajaraman, Indian-American web and technology entrepreneur

=== Entertainment ===
- Anand (actor), Indian film actor
- Anand Babu, Indian film actor
- Anand Bhate (born 1971), Indian classical vocalist
- Anand Chitragupth, Indian music director
- Anand Gandhi (born 1980), Indian filmmaker and screenwriter
- Anand Goradia (born 1975), Indian television actor and writer
- Anand L Rai (born 1971), Indian film director and producer
- Anand Madhusoodanan (born 1988), Indian film score composer
- Anand Modak (1951–2014), Indian film composer and music director
- Anand Raj Anand, Indian music director, composer, lyricist and playback singer
- Anand Ranga (born 1975), Indian film director
- Anand Sai, Indian film art director
- Anand Shetty, Kannada rapper
- Anand Suryavanshi (1975–2022), Indian television actor
- Anand Tucker (born 1963), English film director and producer

=== Politics ===
- Anand (Maoist) or Katakam Sudarshan, Indian cadre
- Anand Ahirwar (born 1964), Indian politician
- Anand Babla (1954–2008), Fijian politician of Indian descent
- Anand Bhushan Pandey, Indian politician
- Anand Dev Bhatt, Nepalese writer and politician
- Anand Dighe (died 2001), Indian politician
- Anand Mohan Singh, Indian politician
- Anand Narain Mulla (1901–1997), Indian poet and politician
- Anand Panyarachun (born 1932), Thai Prime Minister
- Anand Paranjpe (born 1973), Indian industrialist and politician
- Anand Ramlogan (born 1972), Trinidadian Attorney General
- Anand Satyanand (born 1944), New Zealand Governor-General
- Anand Sen Yadav, Indian politician
- Anand Sharma (born 1953), Indian politician
- Anand Singh (Fijian politician) (1948–2020), Indian-Fijian lawyer and politician

=== Sports ===
- Anand Amritraj (born 1951), Indian tennis player and businessman
- Anand Bais (born 1991), Indian cricketer
- Anand Bhatia (born 1947), Indian cricketer
- Anand Deshpande (born 1970), Indian cricketer
- Anand Katti (born 1972), Indian cricketer
- Anand Rajan (born 1987), Indian cricketer
- Anand Tummala (born 1978), Indian American cricketer
- Mangaljalavyn Anand (born 1985), Mongolian sumo wrestler

=== Other ===
- Anand (writer) or P. Satchidanandan (born 1936), Indian writer
- Anand Bakshi (1920–2002), Indian poet and lyricist
- Anand Giridharadas (born 1981), American writer and newspaper columnist
- Anand Gopal, American journalist
- Anand Grover, Indian lawyer
- Anand Jon (born 1976), Indian-American fashion designer
- Anand Mahadevan (born 1979), Indian-Canadian writer
- Anand Naidoo, South African-American news anchor and correspondent
- Anand Neelakantan (born 1973), Indian author
- Anand Patwardhan (born 1950), Indian documentary filmmaker
- Anand Rishiji Maharaj (1900–1992), Indian pattadhar acharya of Jains
- Anand Swarup (died 1937), guru
- Anand Veeravagu, American neurosurgeon
- Anand Yadav (1935–2016), Indian writer
