= Vijay Anand =

Vijay Anand may refer to:

- Vijay Anand (composer) (died 2024), Indian music composer
- Vijay Anand (filmmaker) (1934–2004), Bollywood filmmaker, producer, screenwriter, editor, and actor
- Vijay Anand (politician) (born 1969), Indian politician
- Vijayanand (film), a 2022 Indian film
- Vijayananda Dahanayake (1902–1997), Sri Lankan politician, Prime Minister from 1959 to 1960
- Vijayanand Kashappanavar, Indian politician, member of the Indian National Congress

== See also ==
- Anand (name)
