= Autar Singh Paintal =

Indian medical scientist (1925–2004)

A. S. Paintal FRS
- Born: 24 September 1925; Mogok, British Burma
- Died: 21 December 2004 (aged 79); Delhi, India
- Education: King George Medical College; University of Edinburgh
- Awards: Padma Vibhushan (1986); Honorary member of American Physiological Society; Fellow of the Royal Society; Fellow of the Royal Society of Edinburgh
- Scientific career
- Fields: Physiology
- Workplaces: All India Institute of Medical Sciences, University College of Medical Sciences; Vallabhai Patel Chest Institute; Indian Council of Medical Research

Notes
- Awards

Autar Singh Paintal FRS (24 September 1925 – 21 December 2004) was an Indian medical scientist who made pioneering discoveries in the area of neurosciences and respiratory sciences. He is the first Indian Physiologist to become the Fellow of the Royal Society, London.

His major contribution to the world of science is the development of a single-fiber technique for recording afferent impulses from individual sensory receptors. Paintal discovered several sensory receptors including atrial B receptors, pulmonary J-receptors, ventricular pressure receptors, stomach stretch receptors, and muscle pain receptors. They have set the beginning of new era in physiological understanding.

== Early and personal life ==
Autar Singh Paintal was born on September 24, 1925 to a Punjabi Sikh family in Mogok, British Burma (now Myanmar) to Man Singh and Rajwans Kaur. His father was born in the small village of Pandori in Amritsar district, but left for Burma in 1903 at 7 years old, moving in with his paternal uncle Sundar Singh there after most of his family in Punjab died in a bubonic plague epidemic. Man Singh followed in Sundar Singh's footsteps by becoming a physician after graduating from Rangoon Medical College. Rajwans Kaur was the daughter of a general in the army of the Maharaja of Kapurthala, and the couple had six children of which Autar was the oldest.

As a boy, Autar Singh Paintal switched schools often as his parents moved, studying at St. Paul's in Rangoon (now Yangon), followed by St. Peter's in Mandalay, and then Kingswood in Kalaw, before studying at Khalsa High School in Lahore after 1939, being sent there by his parents to live with his aunt in advance of a looming Japanese invasion. Paintal then studied at Forman Christian College before moving with his family to Lucknow in 1943, where he studied for the next five years at King George's Medical University, receiving an MD in physiology, before completing his PhD under the supervision of David Whitteridge at the University of Edinburgh, where he studied under a Rockefeller Fellowship.

Paintal returned to India in 1953 and joined the All India Institute of Medical Sciences, New Delhi. He later became Director of the Vallabhai Patel Chest Institute. He was also the first Principal of University College of Medical Sciences, Delhi. Paintal subsequently was elevated to Director General of the Indian Council of Medical Research and he was also the founder president of Society of Scientific Values.

Paintal had three children by his first wife Iris Paintal. His second daughter Priti Paintal is a music composer in the UK. His second wife Dr Ashima Anand-Paintal is also a scientist.
