= Richard Fawkes =

English writer and director

- Born: Richard Brian Fawkes; 31 July 1944; Camberley, Surrey, England
- Died: 7 January 2020 (aged 75); Chiswick, West London, England
- Education: Royal Masonic School for Boys
- Occupation: Writer
- Height: 6 ft 1 in (1.85 m)
- Spouse: Cherry Cole (m. 1971)
- Children: 3

Richard Brian Fawkes (31 July 1944 – 7 January 2020) was an English writer and director.

== Early years ==
Fawkes was educated at the Royal Masonic School, Bushey, then spent eighteen months as an instructor at the Outward Bound School in Kenya with Voluntary Service Overseas. A graduate of the University of Wales Lampeter (BA English Honours), he joined the BBC as a general trainee in 1967.

== Career ==
Leaving the BBC in 1971, he joined a commercials production company before going freelance as an Assistant Director for such people as Ridley Scott, Tony Scott, Hugh Hudson, Cliff Owen and Jack Gold. His many film credits as a director include the award-winning Channel 4 series Tom Keating on Painters, Circle Within the Square (which won a prize at the Mesa Festival, Florida) and The Original Three Tenors, a documentary about Caruso, Gigli and Björling presented by Nigel Douglas.

His stage credits include Waltzing in the Clouds (Covent Garden Festival) and A Dog's Life, a one-man show with John Leeson ('the voice of K9’), plus the operas The Yeomen of the Guard (for Opera Holland Park), Faust, The Merry Wives of Windsor and Verbum Nobile by Moniuszko.

He wrote the librettos for Survival Song (nominated for an Olivier Award) and Biko, both with music by Priti Paintal.

He is the author of nine books including a history of Welsh National Opera, Notes From a Low Singer (the autobiography of operatic bass Michael Langdon which he ghosted), The Classical Music Map of Britain and Opera on Film. His History of Opera and History of Classical Music, both for Naxos Audiobooks, won Talkie Awards.

He has written plays for the stage, television and radio, and, for Radio 2, series on Édith Piaf and Johnny Hallyday.

He was a regular columnist for Classical Music magazine and the longest serving columnist for Opera Now magazine.

== Books ==
Date	Name	Publisher
2010	The Classical Music Map of Britain	Classic FM
2002	Opera on Film	International Publishers Marketing
1999	The History of Opera	Naxos
1997	The History of Classical Music	Naxos
1986	Welsh National Opera	Julia MacRae
1983	Notes from a Low Singer	Julia MacRae
1982	Dion Boucicault: A Biography	Quartet Books
1978	Fighting for a laugh: Entertaining the British and American Armed Forces	Macdonald and Jane's
1976	Last Corner of Arabia	Quartet Books
