= Harjit =

Harjit is a Punjabi name and may refer to

- Harjit Harman, Indian singer
- Harjit Sajjan, Canadian politician
- Harjit Singh Anand, Indian official
- Harjit Singh Bedi, Indian judge
