= American Graduate School in Paris =

International relations school in Paris, France

Coordinates: 48.8464°N 2.3287°E

The American Graduate School in Paris
- Other names: AGS
- Former names: American Graduate School of International Relations and Diplomacy
- Established: 1994
- Chairman: Serge Nicolas
- Location: Paris, France
- Website: www.ags.edu

The American Graduate School in Paris (or AGS) is an American institution of higher education located in Paris, France and specializes in International Relations and related disciplines. It is a not-for-profit organization. It is recognized in France by the Ministry of Higher Education as a private institution of higher education ("Etablissement Privé d'Enseignement Supérieur") and offers programs that are accredited in the United States.

The campus is located in Paris, in the Reid Hall center, on the left bank of the Seine River, between the artist district of Montparnasse and the student area of the Latin Quarter.

== Programs ==
Programs include:

- Master of Arts of International Relations and Diplomacy, accredited in the US through Arcadia University, Glenside, Pennsylvania (two-year program)
- Ph.D. in International Relations and Diplomacy, accredited in the US through Arcadia University, Glenside, Pennsylvania
- Certificate programs in NGO Management, European politics, African politics, Middle-Eastern politics and Asian politics
- Various double degree programs

== History ==
The American Graduate School in Paris was established in 1994 under the name American Graduate School of International Relations and Diplomacy. In 2009, it changed its name to American Graduate School in Paris.

== Accreditations ==
All programs are accredited by the Commission on Higher Education of the Middle States Association of Colleges and Schools, per an official partnership with Arcadia University in Glenside, Pennsylvania, USA.

== The faculty ==
Faculty come from numerous countries, including the United States, France, Switzerland, India, Iran, Israel, Germany, Italy, and Great Britain. Faculty is composed of both academics and professionals (diplomats, lawyers, journalists, economists, business consultants). Members of the faculty include Michael Einik, Ruchi Anand, and Douglas Yates.

== Student body and alumni ==
Around 50 nationalities are represented in the student body and alumni. Alumni of the International Relations and Diplomacy programs work in international intergovernmental organizations (UNESCO, UNEP, OECD), non-governmental organizations, government (policy-making, policy analysis, diplomacy), international business, media, and academia.
