= Sonia Anand =

Canadian medical scientist (born 1968)

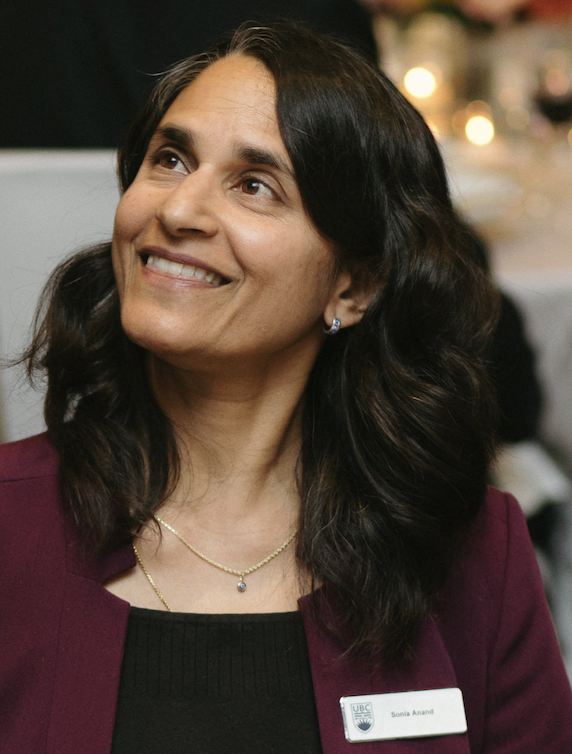
- Dr Sonia Anand at McMaster University
- Born: 1968 (age 57–58); Kentville, Nova Scotia, Canada
- Relatives: Anita Anand (sister); Gita Anand (sister)

Academic background
- Education: MD, 1992, PhD, 2002, McMaster University
- Thesis: Ethnicity and the determinants of cardiovascular disease among South Asians, Chinese, and European Canadians (2005)

Sonia Savitri Anand FCAHS (born 1968) is a Canadian vascular medicine specialist. She previously held the Eli Lilly Canada – May Cohen Chair in Women's Health and currently holds the Michael DeGroote Heart and Stroke Chair in Population Health and Epidemiology at McMaster University.

== Early life and education ==
Anand was born in 1968 to Indian immigrant parents in Kentville, Nova Scotia, Canada. Her parents were both physicians; her mother Saroj D. Ram was an anesthesiologist and a poet, and her father S.V. (Andy) Anand was a general surgeon and artist. Her father was from Yangon, Myanmar, and her mother was from Punjab. Her grandfather was V. A. Sundaram, an activist in the Indian Independence movement, and an associate of Mahatma Gandhi, a confidant of Madan Mohan Malaviya. She has two older sisters, Gita Anand, an employment lawyer in Toronto, and Anita Anand, a lawyer and politician. Anand received her medical degree from McMaster University in 1992 and completed her training and fellowship in internal medicine at the same institution.

== Career ==
Following her fellowship, Anand completed additional training in thrombosis at McMaster and spent a year at the Brigham and Women's Hospital in Boston completing a vascular medicine fellowship. Concurrent with this clinical training Dr. Anand completed her master's degree and PhD in health research methodology.

Anand joined the faculty at McMaster University in 1998. Shortly thereafter, she was promoted to the rank of associate professor in the McMaster University Medical School and named the Eli Lilly Canada – May Cohen Chair in Women's Health. While serving in these roles, she also directed the vascular medicine clinic at Hamilton Health Sciences. Anand became full professor at McMaster in 2008 and is a senior scientist at the Population Health Research Institute. As a result of her research, Anand established the CIHR- funded CARdiovascular INvestigations in Gender (CARING) network focused on Sex and Gender Determinants of Acute Coronary Syndromes and the Metabolic Syndrome from 2004–2012. In 2011, Anand was the recipient of a Tier 1 Canada Research Chair in Ethnic Diversity and Cardiovascular Disease to fund her research on high risk populations such as South Asians and Indigenous peoples in Canada.

Anand's work has covered obesity in people of South Asian origin and in immigrant children.

During the COVID-19 pandemic, Anand became the principal investigator of the COVID CommUNITY-South Asian and COVID CommUNITY-First Nations study which collected, analyzed, and reported data relating to COVID-19 vaccine effectiveness and safety.

As a Canada Research Chair, Anand was appointed director of the Chanchlani Research Centre which aimed to "understand the causes and consequences of common diseases that afflict ethnic populations, women and the socially disadvantaged." Anand was re-appointed as a Tier 1 Canada Research Chair in 2017. Following her re-appointment, Anand was also named the inaugural Associate Chair, Equity, and Diversity for McMaster's Department of Medicine. In 2023 Anand became the inaugural president of the Canadian Society of Vascular Medicine, and was appointed as associate vice-president of global health at McMaster University.

In 2019, Anand was elected a Fellow of the Canadian Academy of Health Sciences. Anand was the recipient of the 2020 Lifetime Achievement Award from the South Asian Health Foundation. In 2022, Anand was awarded the Margolese National Heart Disorders Prize, and was named a Fellow in the Royal Society of Canada's Academy of Science (FRSC). In 2023, Anand received the YWCA Women of Distinction Award.

== Personal life ==
Anand and her husband, a family physician, have three children together.
