= The Art of Sexual Ecstasy =

1989 book by Margot Anand

- Cover
- Author: Margot Anand
- Language: English
- Subject: Tantra
- Publisher: Tarcher
- Publication date: 1989
- Publication place: United States
- Media type: Print (Hardcover and Paperback)
- Pages: 450
- ISBN: 978-0874775402

The Art of Sexual Ecstasy: The Path of Sacred Sexuality for Western Lovers is a 1989 book about Tantra by the author Margot Anand, in which the author presents the foundation of her method known as "SkyDancing Tantra". A popular book addressed to a Western audience, it uses concrete sexual exercises to demonstrate the often esoteric principles of Tantra.

== Reception ==
The Art of Sexual Ecstasy was recommended by Linda Devillers in Health.
