= Anita Anand =

Canadian politician and professor (born 1967)

The Honourable Anita Anand PC MP
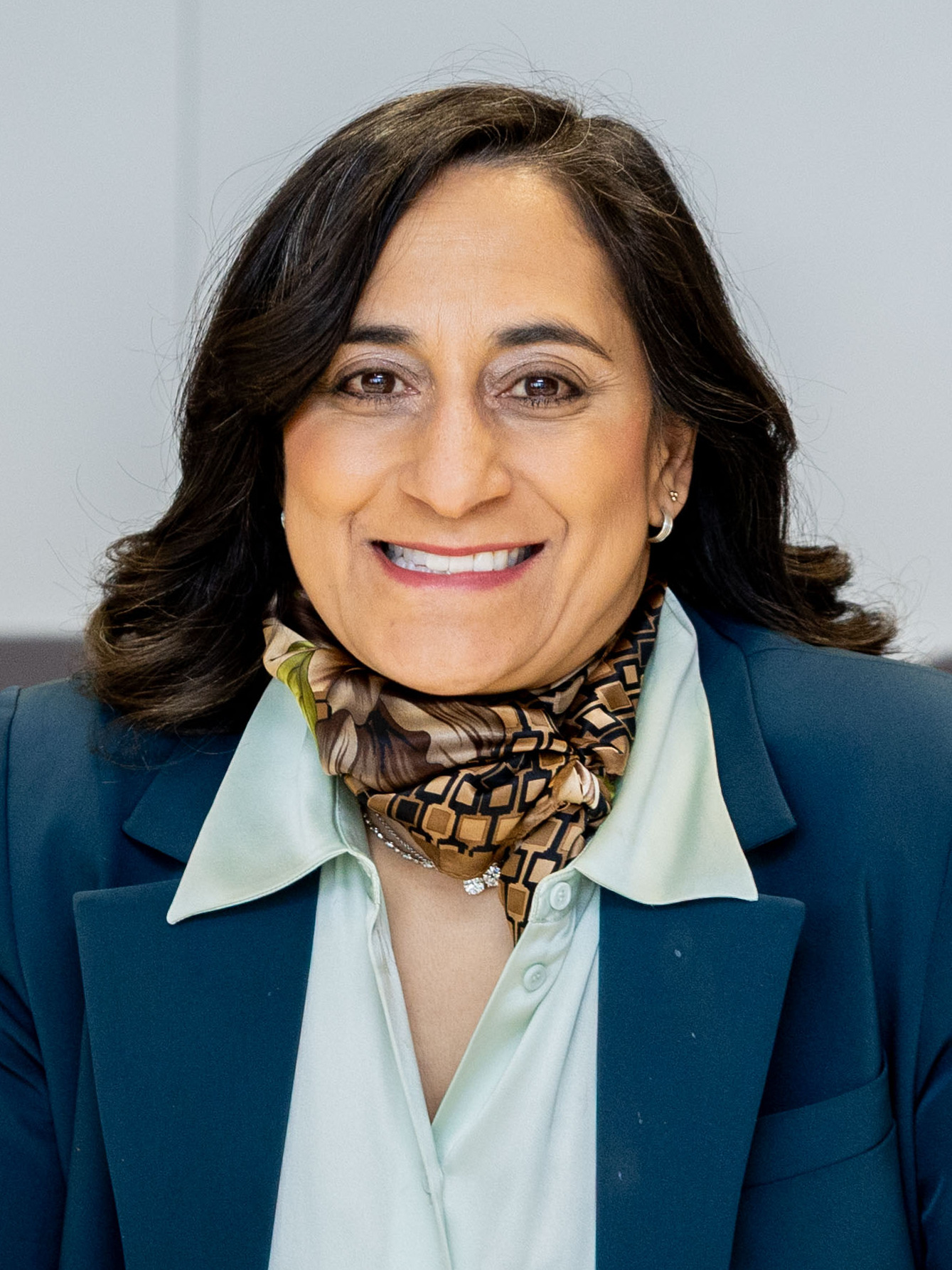
- Anand in 2025

Minister of Foreign Affairs
- Incumbent
- Assumed office May 13, 2025
- Prime Minister: Mark Carney
- Preceded by: Mélanie Joly

Registrar General of Canada Minister of Innovation, Science and Industry
- In office March 14, 2025 – May 13, 2025
- Prime Minister: Mark Carney
- Preceded by: François-Philippe Champagne
- Succeeded by: Mélanie Joly

Minister of Transport
- In office September 19, 2024 – March 14, 2025
- Prime Minister: Justin Trudeau
- Preceded by: Pablo Rodriguez
- Succeeded by: Chrystia Freeland

Minister of Internal Trade
- In office December 20, 2024 – March 14, 2025
- Prime Minister: Justin Trudeau
- Preceded by: Dominic LeBlanc (2019)
- Succeeded by: Chrystia Freeland

President of the Treasury Board
- In office July 26, 2023 – December 20, 2024
- Prime Minister: Justin Trudeau
- Preceded by: Mona Fortier
- Succeeded by: Ginette Petitpas Taylor

Minister of National Defence
- In office October 26, 2021 – July 26, 2023
- Prime Minister: Justin Trudeau
- Preceded by: Harjit Sajjan
- Succeeded by: Bill Blair

Receiver General for Canada Minister of Public Services and Procurement
- In office November 20, 2019 – October 26, 2021
- Prime Minister: Justin Trudeau
- Preceded by: Carla Qualtrough
- Succeeded by: Filomena Tassi

Member of Parliament for Oakville East (Oakville, 2019–2025)
- Incumbent
- Assumed office October 21, 2019
- Preceded by: John Oliver

Personal details
- Born: Indira Anita Anand; May 20, 1967 (age 59) Kentville, Nova Scotia, Canada
- Party: Liberal
- Relatives: Sonia Anand (sister)
- Education: Queen's University (BA); Wadham College, Oxford (BA); Dalhousie University (LLB); University of Toronto (LLM)
- Occupation: Politician; diplomat
- Profession: Lawyer; academician
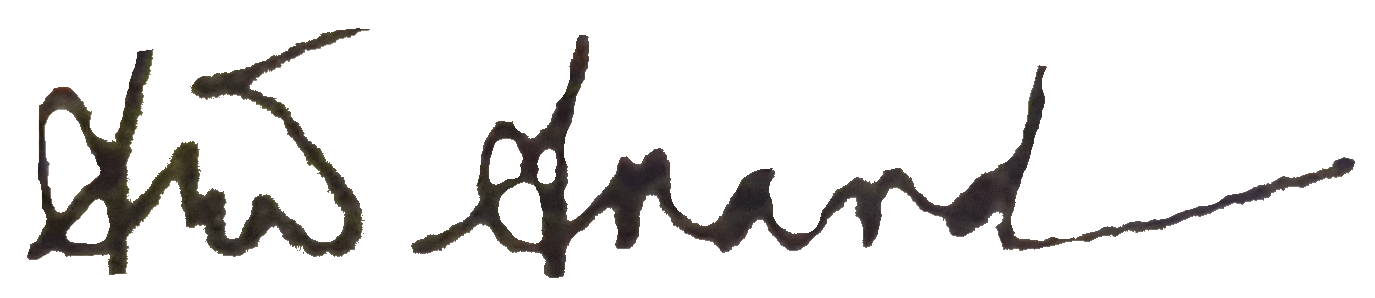
- Signature

Anita Indira Anand (born May 20, 1967) is a Canadian politician, lawyer and former academic who has been Minister of Foreign Affairs since 2025. A member of the Liberal Party, Anand was elected to the House of Commons in 2019 and is the member of Parliament (MP) for Oakville East. She has held a number of Cabinet portfolios since 2019.

Anand was elected as the MP for Oakville in the October 2019 election and was appointed to the Cabinet in November. In the 29th Canadian Ministry, chaired by Prime Minister Justin Trudeau, Anand was first the minister of public services and procurement, where she was responsible for the federal government's procurement of vaccines and personal protective equipment during the COVID-19 pandemic. In 2021, she became the minister of national defence and played a key role in Canadian efforts to provide military aid to Ukraine during the 2022 Russian invasion of Ukraine. Anand was the president of the Treasury Board from 2023 to 2024 and the minister of transport and internal trade from 2024 to 2025. In 2021, Anand was named Canada's "most valuable politician" by The Hill Times, and in 2022, Maclean's described her as the Trudeau government's "all-round fixer".

In the 30th Canadian Ministry, chaired by Prime Minister Mark Carney, Anand was appointed as the minister of innovation, science and industry. She held the role for two months prior to her appointment as the minister of foreign affairs following the 2025 federal election.

Anand is the first Hindu woman to be elected to Parliament and the first Hindu member of Cabinet in Canada. She is only the second woman, after former Prime Minister Kim Campbell, to be minister of national defence.

== Early life and education ==
Anita Indira Anand was born in Kentville, Nova Scotia, in 1967. Her parents were both Indian physicians; her mother Saroj D. Ram was an anesthesiologist, and her father S.V. (Andy) Anand was a general surgeon. Her father was from Tamil Nadu and her mother was from Punjab. Anita has two sisters; her elder sister, Gita Anand, is an employment lawyer in Toronto, and her younger sister Sonia Anand is a physician and researcher at McMaster University.

Her parents were followers of Mahatma Gandhi and her father met him when her grandfather, V. A. Sundaram, was working with the Indian independence movement. Anand's parents immigrated to Canada in the early 1960s, and settled in Kentville, where Anand was born in 1967.

Anand enrolled at Queen's University in 1985, where she earned a Bachelor of Arts in political studies. She went on to Wadham College, Oxford, where she received a Bachelor of Arts (honours) in jurisprudence. After completing her studies at Oxford, she returned to Nova Scotia to obtain her Canadian Bachelor of Laws Dalhousie University before articling in Toronto. She was called to the Ontario Bar in 1994. Anand also received a Master of Laws from the University of Toronto Faculty of Law in 1996.

== Academic and legal career ==
Anand began her legal career as an associate at Torys from 1994 to 1997 (with leave to pursue her master's degree), after articling there from 1992 to 1993. She then became assistant professor (adjunct) from 1997 to 1999 at the Faculty of Law of Western University. In 1999, she became assistant professor in the Faculty of Law at Queen's University, obtaining tenure and advancing to the rank of associate professor in 2003. In 2004, Anand was given the Queen's Law Students' Society Award for Excellence in Teaching.She received a U.S.-Canada Fulbright Award in 2005 and attended Yale Law School as a visiting lecturer in law (fall 2005) while teaching comparative corporate governance.

Anand left Queen's University for the University of Toronto Faculty of Law, in 2006 where she was a full professor. She was associate dean from 2007 to 2009. From 2010 to 2019, Anand was the academic director of the Centre for the Legal Profession, as well as for its Program on Ethics in Law and Business. At the time of her election, she was a senior fellow and member of the Board of Governors of Massey College. She was also cross-appointed to the Rotman School of Management as the director of policy and research at the Capital Markets Research Institute, and to the Munk School of Global Affairs at the University of Toronto.

On September 17, 2019, it was announced that Anand would receive the Yvan Allaire Medal from the Royal Society of Canada. The medal is bestowed annually for an outstanding contribution in governance of private and public organizations. The Royal Society stated that Anand's research "significantly altered global thinking about best practices for boards of directors, including the importance of diversity on boards".

== Political career ==
=== 2019 federal election ===
In the lead-up to the 2019 federal election, Anand decided to pursue the Liberal nomination for the riding of Oakville, Ontario, after the incumbent John Oliver announced that he would not run in the 2019 election. On June 12, 2019, Anita Anand won the Liberal nomination for the riding of Oakville, Ontario by a majority of votes on the first ballot. She defeated former member of Provincial Parliament Kevin Flynn for the nomination. On October 21, 2019, Anand won the riding of Oakville with 30,265 votes.

Anand was sworn in as the member of Parliament for Oakville on November 22, 2019, to represent Oakville in the House of Commons in the 43rd Canadian Parliament.

=== Minister of Public Services and Procurement ===
On November 20, 2019, Anand was sworn in as a member of the Privy Council and as the public services and procurement minister at Rideau Hall.

At the beginning of the COVID-19 pandemic in Canada, Anand and her department acted to buy personal protective equipment (PPE) and medical supplies for Canada's health care system. In order to ensure reliable access to PPE in a hyper-competitive market, Anand and her department adopted an aggressive procurement strategy and engaged a large number of suppliers to diversify Canada's supply chains. In April 2021, Anand told the House of Commons Health Committee that Public Services and Procurement Canada had procured over 2.5 billion articles of personal protective equipment, "with a substantial amount of that equipment being made right here, at home".

Beginning in the summer of 2020, the Canadian government signed contracts with the producers of seven leading COVID-19 vaccine candidates, and the producers of supplies needed to package and administer those vaccines. Initially, Canada's target was to receive enough vaccines to fully immunize all eligible Canadians by September 30, 2021. By the end of July 2021, Canada had received a cumulative total of more than 66.4 million vaccines. By August 2021, Canada had attained the highest vaccination rate in the world.

Anand also worked to finalise Canada's agreements with vaccine producers regarding the procurement and delivery of COVID-19 vaccine doses for children. After Health Canada approved the Pfizer–BioNTech COVID-19 vaccine for use in pediatric populations under the age of 12 years on November 19, 2021, the first child doses of the vaccine arrived in Canada two days later, on November 21, 2021.

=== 2021 federal election ===
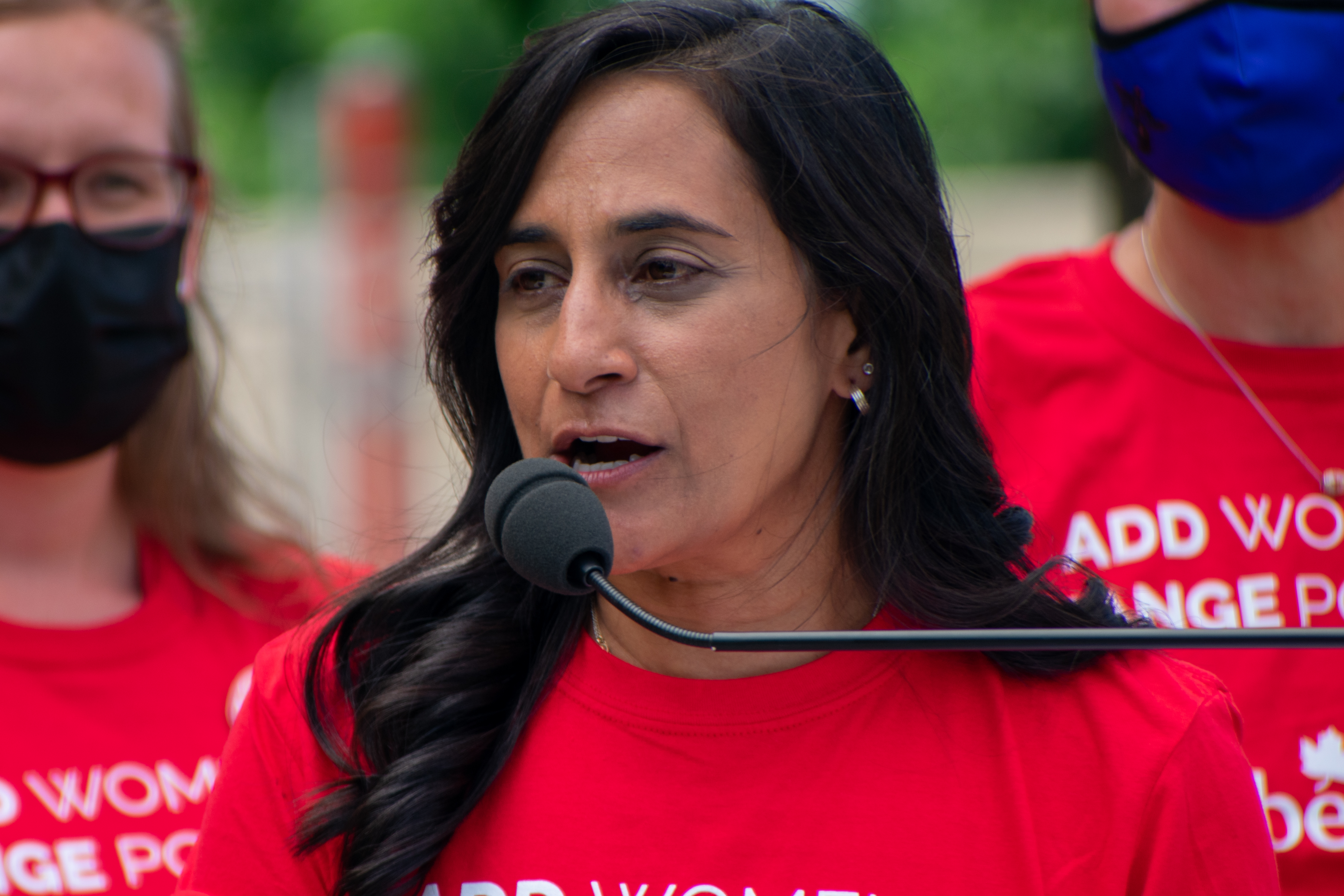
Anand speaking at a Liberal Party rally in Hamilton, Ontario in the weeks leading up to the 2021 Canadian federal election

Anand was re-elected to Parliament following the 2021 Canadian federal election. She defeated Conservative Kerry Colborne with 46 per cent of the vote.

=== Minister of National Defence ===
On October 26, 2021, Anand was sworn in as Minister of National Defence at Rideau Hall. She is the second woman in Canadian history to take on the role of national defence minister, after former prime minister Kim Campbell in the 1990s. Anand said that her priority was tackling sexual misconduct and changing culture in the Canadian Armed Forces.

On November 4, 2021, Anand announced that she accepted in full an interim recommendation from former Supreme Court of Canada Justice Louise Arbour that the investigation and prosecution of military sexual misconduct cases be referred to Canada's civilian justice system.

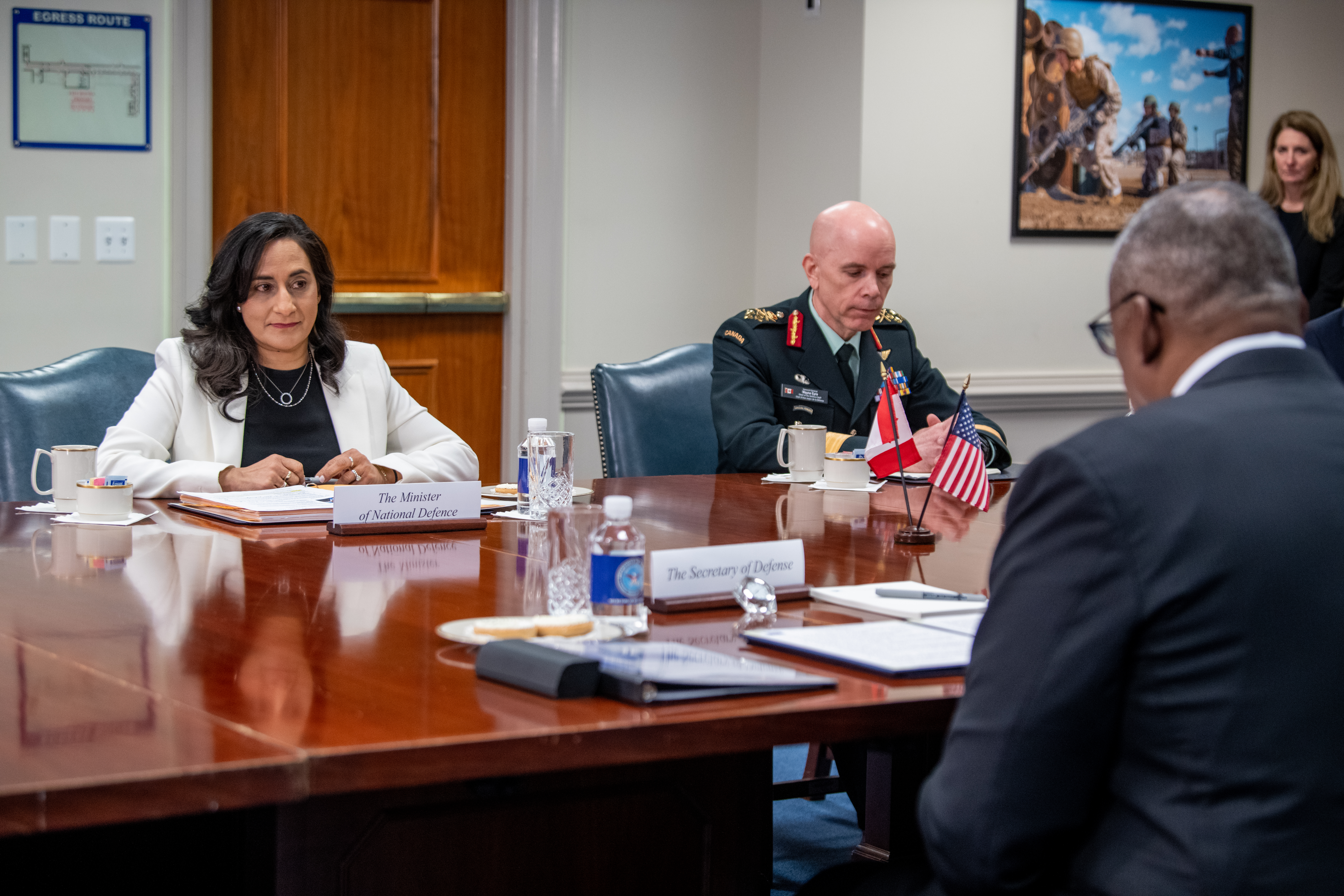
Anand and General Wayne Eyre in 2022

On December 13, 2021, Anand gave an official apology on behalf of the Government of Canada to people affected by sexual misconduct in the Canadian Armed Forces and Department of National Defence. She was joined by General Wayne Eyre, Chief of the Defence Staff, who apologized on behalf of the military, and Deputy Minister Jody Thomas, who apologized on behalf of the department.

On May 30, 2022, Anand was joined by Louise Arbour, General Wayne Eyre, and Deputy Minister Bill Matthews to release the final report of the Independent External Comprehensive Review into Sexual Misconduct and Sexual Harassment in the Canadian Armed Forces and Department of National Defence.

On July 9, 2022, in Truro, Anand and Trudeau offered the Government of Canada's official apology to the members and descendants of No. 2 Construction Battalion, an all-Black battalion that faced anti-Black racism and discrimination during its service to Canada in World War I.

On December 16, 2022, Anand presented a report to Parliament detailing her official response to all 48 of Louise Arbour's 48 recommendations to respond to sexual misconduct and harassment in Canada's military and defence department, pursuant to Arbour's ask that Anand inform Parliament by the end of 2022 of any recommendations that the government would reject. Anand rejected none of the recommendations and stressed the need to change Canadian military culture to attract recruits.

==== War in Ukraine ====
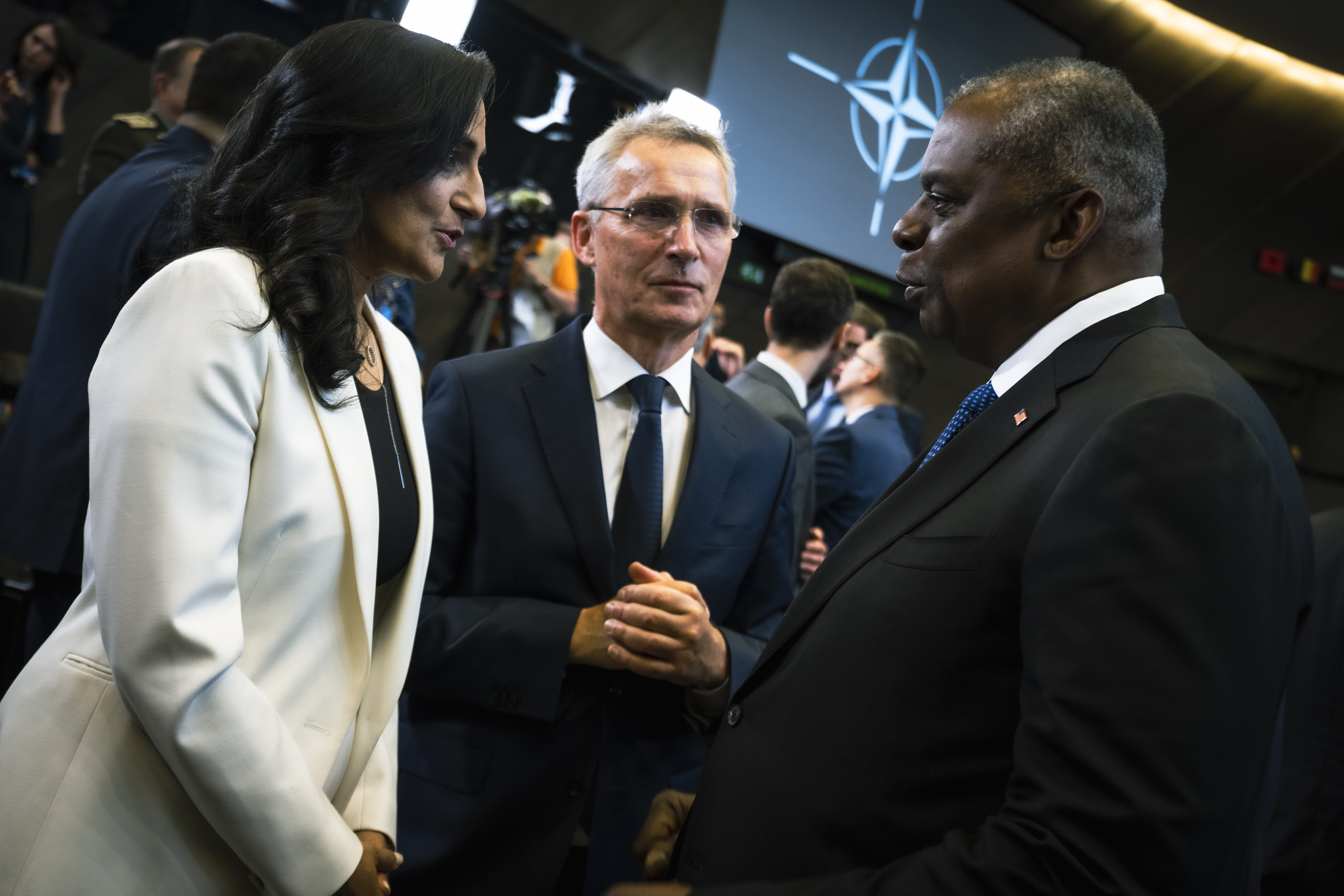
Anand stands with NATO Secretary General Jens Stoltenberg and U.S. Secretary of Defense Lloyd Austin in Brussels, Belgium at a meeting of NATO Defence Ministers in June 2022

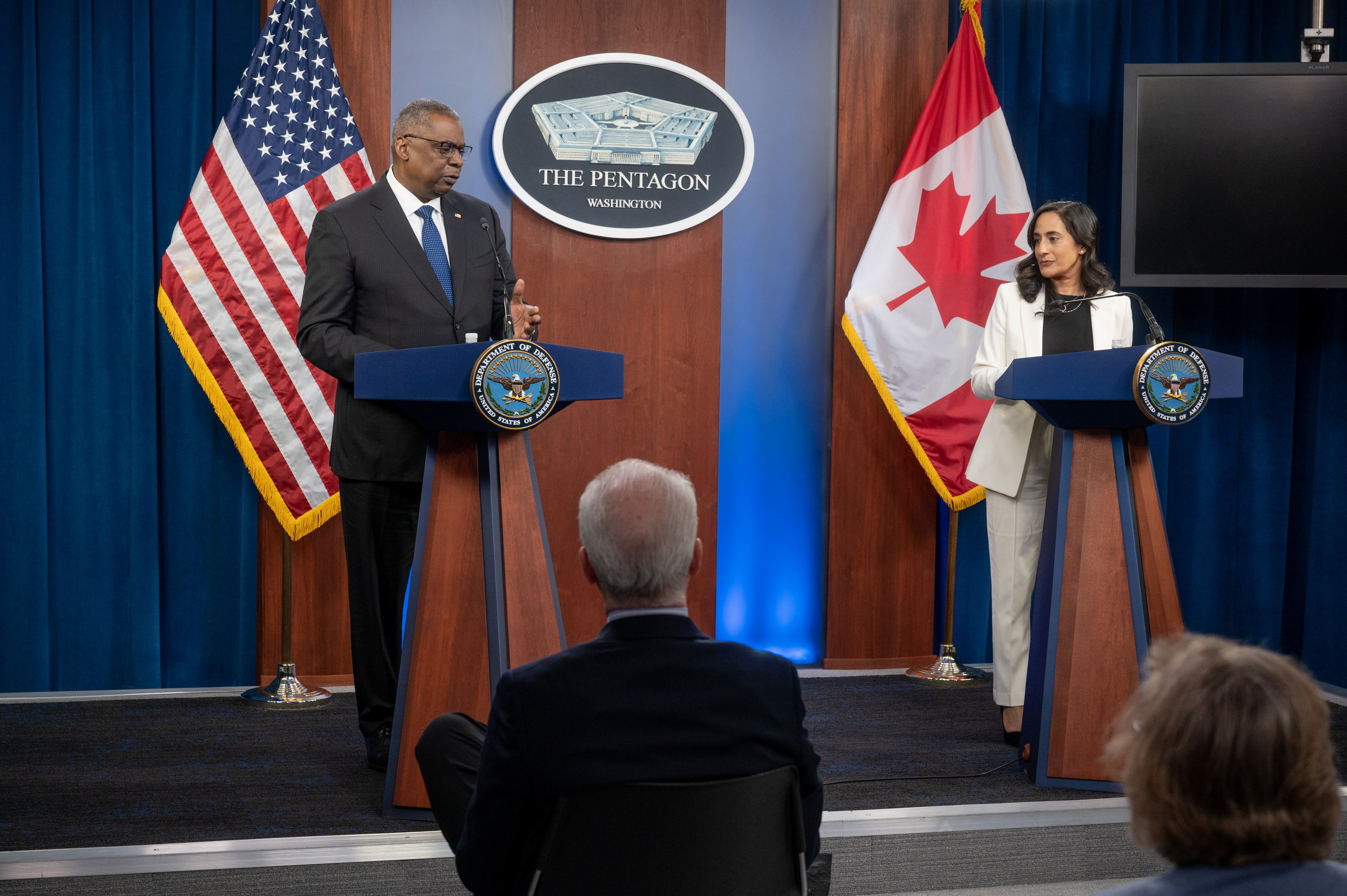
Anand with U.S. Secretary of Defense Lloyd Austin in April 2022

In late January 2022, Anand and Trudeau announced that Canada would extend its training mission in Ukraine, Operation Unifier, by three years, and raise the ceiling of deployed personnel from 200 to 400. In announcing the extension, Anand stated, "The biggest contribution that Canada can make to Ukraine right now is people. We have trained, our soldiers have trained over 30,000 Ukrainian soldiers. We should not underestimate the importance of this training mission."

A few days later, Anand visited Kyiv as a sign of Canadian solidarity. Anand stated that "Russia has a choice, and that choice is to negotiate with a view to de-escalation" or it will "face severe sanctions and consequences". While in Ukraine, Anand met with Ukraine's Defence Minister Oleksii Reznikov to discuss military aid to Ukraine, including in the area of cybersecurity.

Days before the Russian invasion of Ukraine, Anand announced an expansion of Canada's contribution to NATO operations in Europe. Under the umbrella of Operation Reassurance she announced the deployment of approximately 120 members of an artillery battery to join the Canadian-led NATO Enhanced Forward Presence battle group in Latvia, and the deployment of an additional Halifax-class frigate to NATO maritime forces.

On March 19, HMCS Halifax left port and joined NATO maritime forces in the Baltic region. At the departure ceremony, Anand said, "At this time it is so important for us all to be united, to stand together, to stand against unwarranted and illegal Russian aggression, and to stand up for peace, deterrence and the defensive posture on which NATO is built."

Following Russia's invasion, Anand announced packages of additional military aid to Ukraine in February and March 2022, including Carl Gustaf anti-armour weapons, rockets, helmets, gas masks, and night-vision goggles. Further types of military aid announced by Anand included fragmentation vests and meal packs, 4,500 M72 rocket launchers and up to 7,500 hand grenades, and funding to enable Ukraine to purchase modern satellite imagery. Anand also announced the procurement and donation to Ukraine of Canadian-made, specialized cameras for Bayraktar TB-2 drones.

On March 8, during a trip to Latvia, Anand and Trudeau announced the multi-year renewal of Operation Reassurance.

On April 14, at Canadian Forces Base (CFB) Trenton, Anand announced that the Canadian Armed Forces would deploy between 100 and 150 troops to Poland, to assist with Polish efforts to manage the flow of, and care for, Ukrainians fleeing the Russian invasion. In late April 2022, Anand announced further military aid for Ukraine. On April 22, 2022, Anand confirmed that Canada had delivered M777 howitzers to Ukrainian Forces. At a conference of the Ukraine Defense Consultative Group at Ramstein Air Base, Canada announced that it had signed a contract for eight armoured vehicles for Ukraine. Just days later, Anand confirmed that the Canadian Armed Forces had begun to train Ukrainian forces in the use of the howitzers.

On May 8, an additional $50 million in military assistance to Ukraine was announced, including 18 drone cameras, $15 million for high-resolution satellite imagery, additional ammunition and small arms. On May 24, Anand announced at the Ukrainian Cultural Centre in Victoria that Canada had purchased more than 20,000 rounds of artillery ammunition for Ukraine, which are compatible with M777 artillery guns provided by Canada, at a cost of $98 million CAD. On June 15, at a meeting of the Ukraine Defense Contact Group in Brussels, Anand said that Canada would donate $9 million worth of M777 howitzer replacement barrels to Ukraine.

At the 2022 NATO Leaders Summit in Madrid, Anand agreed with Latvia's Defence Minister, Artis Pabriks, to upgrade the Canadian-led NATO Enhanced Forward Presence Battle Group in Latvia to a brigade size. At the summit, Canada committed new military aid for Ukraine, specifically, six drone cameras and up to 39 armoured combat support vehicles.

In July 2022, at the 15th Conference of Defense Ministers of the Americas in Brasília, Anand led an effort to convince other countries present to denounce the 2022 Russian invasion of Ukraine. Anand told Politico that "Canada and I, as the representative here, felt that it's very important to voice this concern in a tangible way here at the conference... There is an impact of the Russian invasion on this region, a negative impact on economies here, on food security in our hemisphere." Canada's efforts were successful, with the conference's final declaration stating, "The conflicts present around the world, such as the invasion of Ukraine and the violent acts by armed groups that terrorize the population in Haiti are not legitimate means to settle disputes, therefore the Member States of the CDMA, seek peaceful solutions as soon as possible." The Declaration also included a disclaimer by Canada, Colombia, Dominican Republic, Ecuador, Guatemala, Haiti, Paraguay, the United States of America and Uruguay, reiterating these countries "condemnation in the strongest terms of the Russian Federation's illegal, invasion of Ukraine."

On August 4, 2022, Anand announced the deployment of up to 225 Canadian Armed Forces personnel to the United Kingdom to train new recruits to the Armed Forces of Ukraine, under Operation Unifier.

In September 2022, Anand told the Canadian Broadcasting Corporation that it would increase the capacity of the Royal Canadian Air Force hub in Prestwick, Scotland, by adding a third C-130 Hercules aircraft and increasing its presence to 55 personnel, enabling it to deliver additional military aid to Ukraine.

Anand visited Warsaw on October 11, 2022, and met her Polish counterpart Mariusz Błaszczak. While in Warsaw, Anand announced the deployment of approximately forty Canadian Armed Forces combat engineers to Poland to train Ukrainian sappers under Operation Unifier. Referring to the Russian attacks, Anand condemned the Russian missile attacks on Ukrainian cities as war crimes. The next day, at a meeting of the U.S.-led Ukraine Defense Contact Group in Brussels, Anand announced an additional $47 million CAD in military aid to Ukraine, including "artillery rounds, satellite communications, winter clothing and drone cameras, among other assistance".

On November 14, 2022, Canada announced an additional $500 million in military aid for Ukraine, bringing its total commitment of military aid to over $1 billion CAD since February 2022. On November 16, 2022, Canada announced the extension of Operation Unifier in the United Kingdom through the end of 2023. At a meeting of the Ukraine Defense Contact Group later that day, Anand also announced that Canada would contribute $34 million in additional military aid to Ukraine, in the form of drone cameras, additional winter clothing, and satellite services.

Following Ukrainian officials' repeated requests to NATO countries for air defence systems, Anand announced on January 10, 2023, that Canada would donate a NASAMS air defence system to Ukraine at a cost of approximately $406 million. Oleksii Reznikov, Ukraine's defence minister, said that the system will "considerably reinforce" Ukraine's defence capabilities.

Anand visited Kyiv and Irpin during a trip to Ukraine on January 18, 2023. There, she met with Ukrainian Defence Minister Oleksii Reznikov and announced that Canada would donate 200 Roshel Senator armoured personnel carriers manufactured in Mississauga, Ontario. This announcement marked the full allocation of the additional $500 million in military aid to Ukraine announced by Canada on November 14, 2022.

Anand announced on January 26, 2023, that Canada would donate four of the Canadian Army's Leopard 2 main battle tanks to Ukraine, with the possibility of more to follow.

==== NORAD and continental defence ====
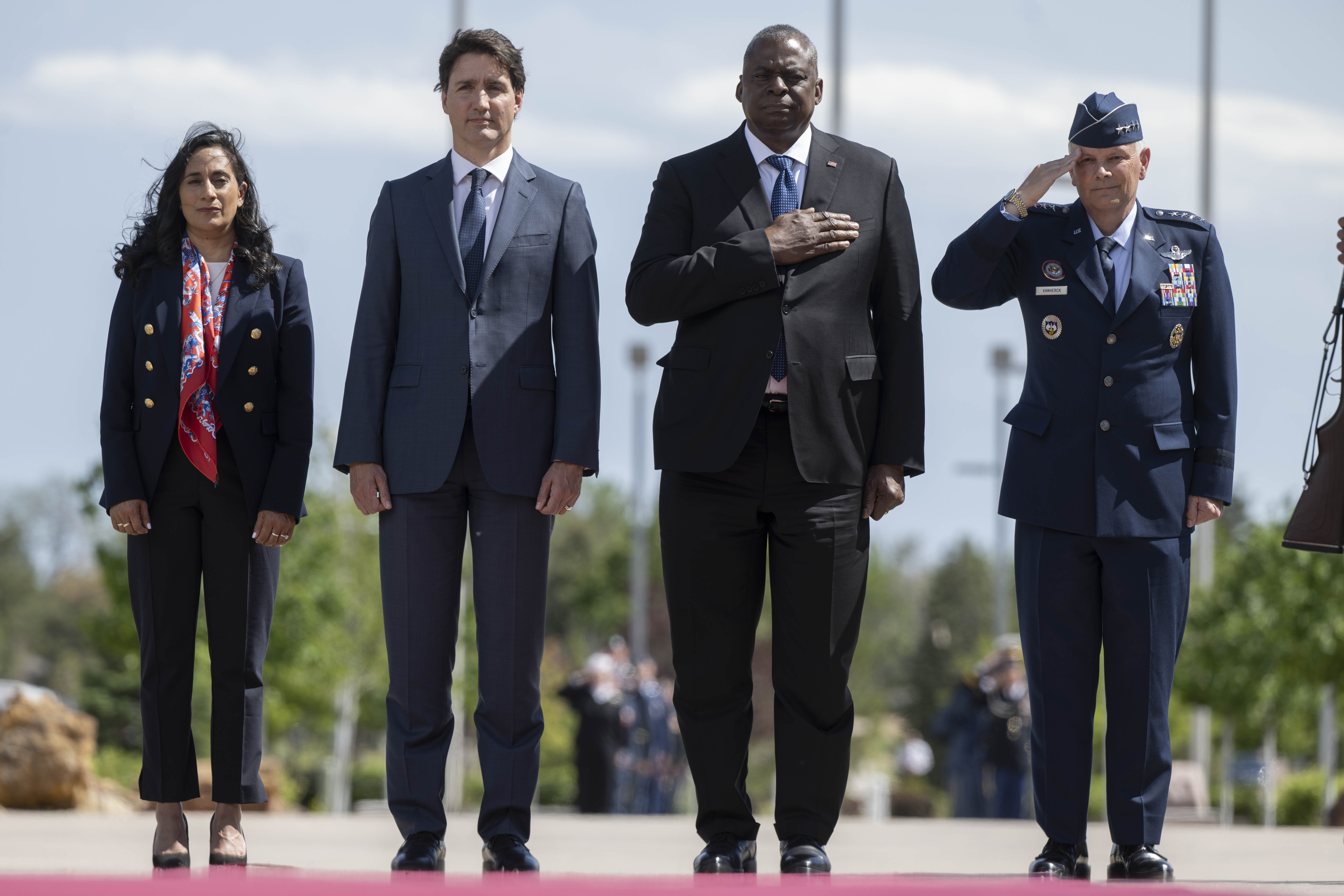
At United States Northern Command headquarters, Anand, Canadian Prime Minister Justin Trudeau, U.S. Secretary of Defense Lloyd Austin and General Glen D. VanHerck listen to the playing of the Canadian and American national anthems in 2022

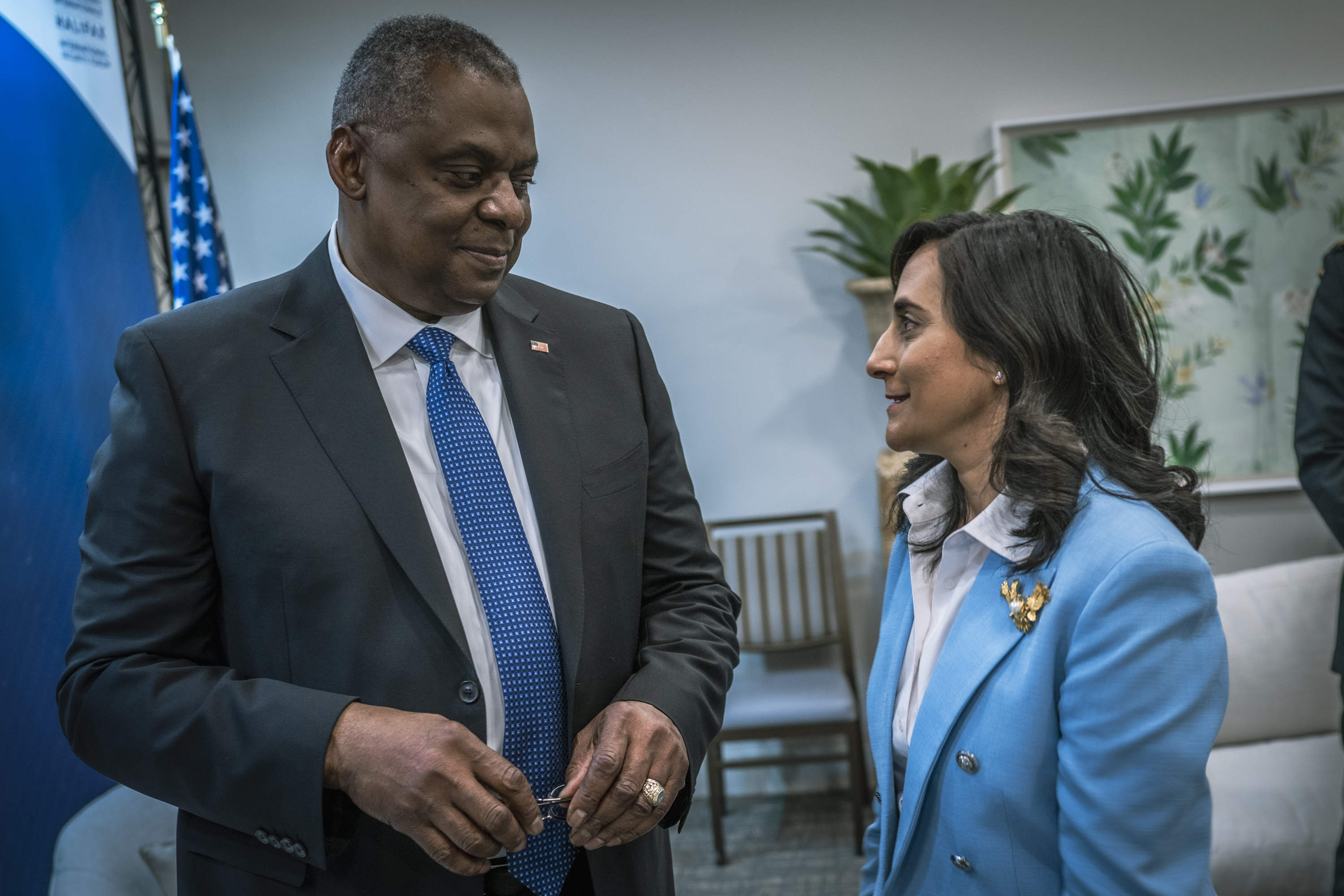
Anand hosts U.S. Secretary of Defense Lloyd Austin at the 2022 Halifax International Security Forum, in her home province of Nova Scotia

Anand's 2021 mandate letter from Prime Minister Trudeau instructed her to "work with the United States to modernize the North American Aerospace Defence Command." On June 20, 2022, at CFB Trenton, Anand announced a five-point NORAD modernization plan that is estimated to cost approximately $40 billion over twenty years. Anand said that there was "pressing need" to respond to threats like hypersonic and cruise missiles, and declared that the plan was "the most significant upgrade to NORAD from a Canadian perspective in almost four decades."

During a visit to Labrador on August 24, 2022, Anand confirmed that CFB Goose Bay would be one of four northern locations to receive basing upgrades under the $15.68 billion allocated for infrastructure upgrades in Canada's NORAD modernization plan.

On January 9, 2023, Anand announced that Canada had finalized the acquisition of 88 Lockheed Martin F-35 Lightning II fighter jets for the Royal Canadian Air Force. In a statement, Anand said, "As the rules-based international order is challenged around the world, the F-35 will be essential for protecting Canadians, enhancing Arctic security and national sovereignty, and enabling Canada to meet its NATO, NORAD and other obligations well into the future."

==== Indo-Pacific ====
Days after the Russian invasion of Ukraine in February 2022, Anand told the Ottawa Conference on Security and Defence that "Europe is not the only fault line in the global security environment at the current time." She spoke about the need to be "cognizant of China's range of assertive activities in the Indo-Pacific region and around the world ... the patterns are there for all to see, frankly." Anand described Chinese activity in the East and South China Seas as "coercive", also citing theft of intellectual property, "irresponsible and very concerning behaviour in cyberspace", and the detention of Michael Spavor and Michael Kovrig.

While in Singapore to attend the Shangri-La Dialogue in June 2022, Anand addressed Chinese interceptions of Royal Canadian Air Force aircraft. She told Reuters, "[T]he interceptions by the Chinese of our (aircraft) are very concerning and unprofessional and we need to ensure that the safety and security of our pilots is not at risk, especially when they are simply monitoring as required under UN-sanctioned missions."

Following a visit to Taiwan by Speaker of the United States House of Representatives Nancy Pelosi, Anand told CBC News in August 2022 that "it is routine for legislators from our countries to travel internationally, and China's escalatory response simply risks increasing tensions and destabilizing the region." She called on China "not to unilaterally change the status quo by force in the region and to resolve cross-strait differences by peaceful means".

At the 2022 Halifax International Security Forum, Anand foreshadowed the release of the Trudeau government's Indo-Pacific strategy. She stated that Canada would "increase [its] military presence and enhance [its] defence and security relationships with partners and allies in the [Indo-Pacific] region." She added, "We will challenge China when we ought to. We will cooperate with China when we must."

On November 27, 2022, Anand announced the defence and security elements of Canada's Indo-Pacific Strategy. Anand said that the strategy will boost Canada's annual deployment of frigates to the Indo-Pacific from two to three, and that it would bolster participation of Canadian aviators and soldiers in regional military exercises. The Strategy referred to China as an "increasingly disruptive global power".

=== President of the Treasury Board ===
Anand assumed the position of President of the Treasury Board following a cabinet shuffle initiated by Prime Minister Justin Trudeau amid a challenging political environment for the incumbent Liberal party.

==== Greening Government ====
In her role, Anand worked to advance the Greening Government Strategy, modernize and strengthen the Government of Canada's digital capabilities, strengthen management of taxpayer dollars, and promote diversity and inclusion within the public service. In October 2024, Anand announced that the federal government would purchase at least $10million of carbon removal services in the race to reach net-zero government operations by 2050. The purchases in carbon removal services will be made through TBS' Low-Carbon Fuel Procurement Program (LCFPP), an eight-year, $134.9 million initiative to reduce emissions from federal air and marine operations. This investment followed the Budget 2024 decision to expand the LCFPP to include the procurement of carbon dioxide removal services in addition to low-carbon intensity fuels.

==== Canada-US Regulatory Cooperation Council ====
Early in 2024, Anand announced her intention to re-ignite the Canada-U.S. Regulatory Cooperation Council, a bilateral forum between Canada and the United States that focuses on reducing regulatory barriers to ease trade, and save money for cross-border businesses

=== Minister of Transport ===
In September 2024, the Prime Minister appointed Anand minister of transport, in addition to her role as president of the Treasury Board.

==== Air ====
In her new role, Anand announced a US preclearance facility will be built at Billy Bishop Airport downtown Toronto.

On December 21, 2024, she released the Airline Passenger Protection Regulations. Canada was the first country to bring in regulations of this sort and Minister Anand is seeking to strike the right balance between passenger protections and a competitive airline industry. In particular, the Canadian Transportation Agency's proposed amendments to the Air Passenger Protection Regulations were published in Part I of the Canada Gazette on December 21, 2024, for a 75-day public comment period.

Minister Anand explained that, "The goal of these proposed amendments is to make the regulations clearer for both travellers and air carriers. The proposed amendments eliminate grey zones and ambiguity about when passengers are owed compensation, which will ensure quicker resolutions for passengers."

==== Shipping ====
In February 2025, Anand announced investments to strengthen port infrastructure, supply chain efficiency, and transportation decarbonization throughout Canada. On February 5, Anand announced $25 million for the Halifax Port Authority to advance the Halifax–Hamburg green shipping corridor, reducing emissions and improving port infrastructure. On February 11, she announced $35.5 million for clean marine technology in British Columbia under the Green Shipping Corridor Program, funding shore power, clean energy adoption, and low-emission vessels. This funding also allows for shore power technology, low-emission vessels, and clean energy adoption at ports, which aims to support Canada's transition to net-zero marine transport. On February 12, Anand announced $33.1 million for six infrastructure projects in British Columbia and Alberta under the National Trade Corridors Fund. The investment supports rail and port upgrades to enhance freight movement, intermodal connections, and supply chain efficiency. These investments strengthen Canada's trade networks and advance sustainable transportation.

On February 4, 2025, Anand announced over $125 million through Canada's Oceans Protection Plan to strengthen marine safety in 47 communities.

==== Rail ====
In October 2024, Anand announced $45 million in rail safety nationwide. Then on February 12, 2025, Anand together with Trudeau and Martin Imbleau, President and CEO of Alto, announced Alto, Canada's first high-speed rail network connecting Toronto and Quebec City. Spanning 1,000 kilometres (620 mi) and reaching speeds of 300 km/h (190 mph), the project is intended to cut travel times in half, with additional stops in Peterborough, Ottawa, Montreal, Laval, and Trois-Rivières. As Canada's largest infrastructure project, Alto is expected to boost GDP by $35 billion annually, create over 51,000 jobs during construction, and enhance economic productivity. The government committed $3.9 billion over six years for project development, with Cadence, a consortium of global transportation firms, selected to design, build, finance, operate, and maintain the network. Anand highlighted Alto's role in strengthening regional economies and reducing emissions and the collaboration between public and private partners to deliver a modern, efficient transportation system.

=== Minister of Internal Trade ===
Anand was sworn into a new cabinet position as Minister of Transport and Internal Trade as of December 20, 2024.

Anand was speculated to be a potential candidate in the 2025 Liberal Party of Canada leadership election to succeed outgoing Prime Minister Justin Trudeau. On January 11, she announced that she would not be standing for re-election in the 2025 Canadian federal election, instead opting to retire from politics to return to academia and research. On January 25, she endorsed former Bank of Canada governor Mark Carney; and retracted her intention to retire from politics, opting to seek re-election.

Anand announced a public consultation about the Canada-US border on January 31, 2025, aimed at expanding security screening at Canadian ports, enhancing background checks, reinforcing border security, and protecting supply chains.

As the United States considered new tariffs, Anand emphasized the importance of strengthening internal trade and supporting Canadian businesses to ensure long-term economic stability. She advocated for reducing internal trade barriers between all provinces and territories, and enhancing domestic market resilience, arguing that greater economic integration within Canada will bolster competitiveness and safeguard jobs. Anand said that eliminating interprovincial trade barriers could boost GDP and domestic trade. She pushed for regulatory reforms to streamline trade between provinces, given mounting external trade pressures.

On February 7, 2025, Anand attended the Canada-U.S. Economic Summit, where she emphasized the need for a long-term prosperity agenda for Canada amid a 30-day pause on U.S. tariffs. Anand met leaders from trade, business, public policy, Indigenous communities, and labour to discuss strategies for breaking barriers, diversifying exports, and boosting productivity.

Anand led efforts to reduce interprovincial trade barriers and improve labour mobility, working with provinces and territories to streamline regulations, cut red tape, and enhance economic integration. Anand said that Canada's fragmented regulatory framework limits domestic trade, making it easier for some businesses to export abroad than to neighbouring provinces. She pushed for harmonizing agricultural regulations, simplifying licensing requirements, and removing restrictions on the transport of goods. With U.S. tariffs looming, Anand positioned internal trade reform as a critical tool to offset protectionist policies.

On January 31, Anand outlined her proposal for tackling barriers to internal trade in an opinion piece in the Toronto Star.

At a meeting of the Committee on Internal Trade in February 2025, provinces and territories committed to eliminating exceptions to the Canadian Free Trade Agreement (CFTA), prioritizing the removal of regulatory and administrative barriers to the movement of goods in Canada, aiming to ensure workers can work in any jurisdiction in this country without delay, and to make it easier to buy and sell Canadian goods. On February 21, The Globe and Mail broke the story that the federal government was removing more than half of their exceptions from the Canadian Free Trade Agreement, opening up competition across the country. The Committee on Internal Trade met again in Toronto on February 28, preparing their proposal for the First Ministers Meeting. On March 5, the provinces and territories, in a meeting of the First Ministers with then Prime Minister Justin Trudeau, reached an agreement on a number of measures to reduce internal barriers to trade, including direct-to-consumer alcohol sales.

=== Minister of Innovation, Science and Economic Development ===
On March 14, 2025, Anand was sworn into a new cabinet position under Mark Carney's government as Minister of Innovation, Science and Economic Development.

==== Steel and Aluminum Sector ====
One of Minister Anand's priorities was defending Canada's steel and aluminum sectors amid rising concerns over the reintroduction of unjustified U.S. tariffs. She led strategic engagements with Canadian manufacturers, unions, and American counterparts to uphold cross-border supply chains and defend Canadian workers and exporters against protectionist measures with an open letter.

Anand worked to strengthen Canada's industrial resilience by supporting domestic production of critical goods. Through targeted investments and regulatory reform, she sought to safeguard Canadian economic sovereignty, boost supply chain security, and foster innovation in sectors such as clean technology, life sciences, and advanced manufacturing.

==== Clean technology and advanced manufacturing ====
As part of Canada's clean economy strategy, Anand encouraged investment in next-generation manufacturing. She oversaw a federal partnership with Siemens Canada to establish a new electric vehicle (EV) battery research and development centre in Oakville, Ontario. The centre is designed to accelerate innovation in battery efficiency and production methods, ensuring Canadian competitiveness in the global clean energy transition.

In addition, Anand announced a $49 million investment through the Strategic Innovation Fund in HTEC's $472 million hydrogen liquefaction project in North Vancouver. The facility will capture 15 tonnes per day of industrial by-product hydrogen and convert it into clean fuel for distribution across British Columbia and Alberta. The project is part of HTEC's broader H2 Gateway initiative, which includes up to 20 refuelling stations, three hydrogen production facilities, and a fleet of hydrogen-powered heavy-duty trucks. It is expected to maintain up to 500 jobs and expand Canada's leadership in the emerging hydrogen economy.

==== Biomanufacturing and Life Sciences Strategy ====
Anand played a central role in the implementation of Canada's Biomanufacturing and Life Sciences Strategy, aimed at rebuilding the country's domestic capacity to produce vaccines, therapies, and medical technologies. Since March 2020, over $2.3 billion has been invested in biomanufacturing across Canada.

Under her leadership, the government announced a $49.9 million investment in STEMCELL Technologies Canada Inc. through the Strategic Innovation Fund to support a $222 million project that includes the construction of two new biomanufacturing facilities.

In June 2025, Anand announced support for OmniaBio, a Canadian biotechnology firm seeking to expand its Hamilton-based facility at McMaster Innovation Park. The expansion will allow the company to manufacture cell and gene therapies at clinical and commercial scale, using AI- and robotics-enabled platforms.

=== Minister of Foreign Affairs ===
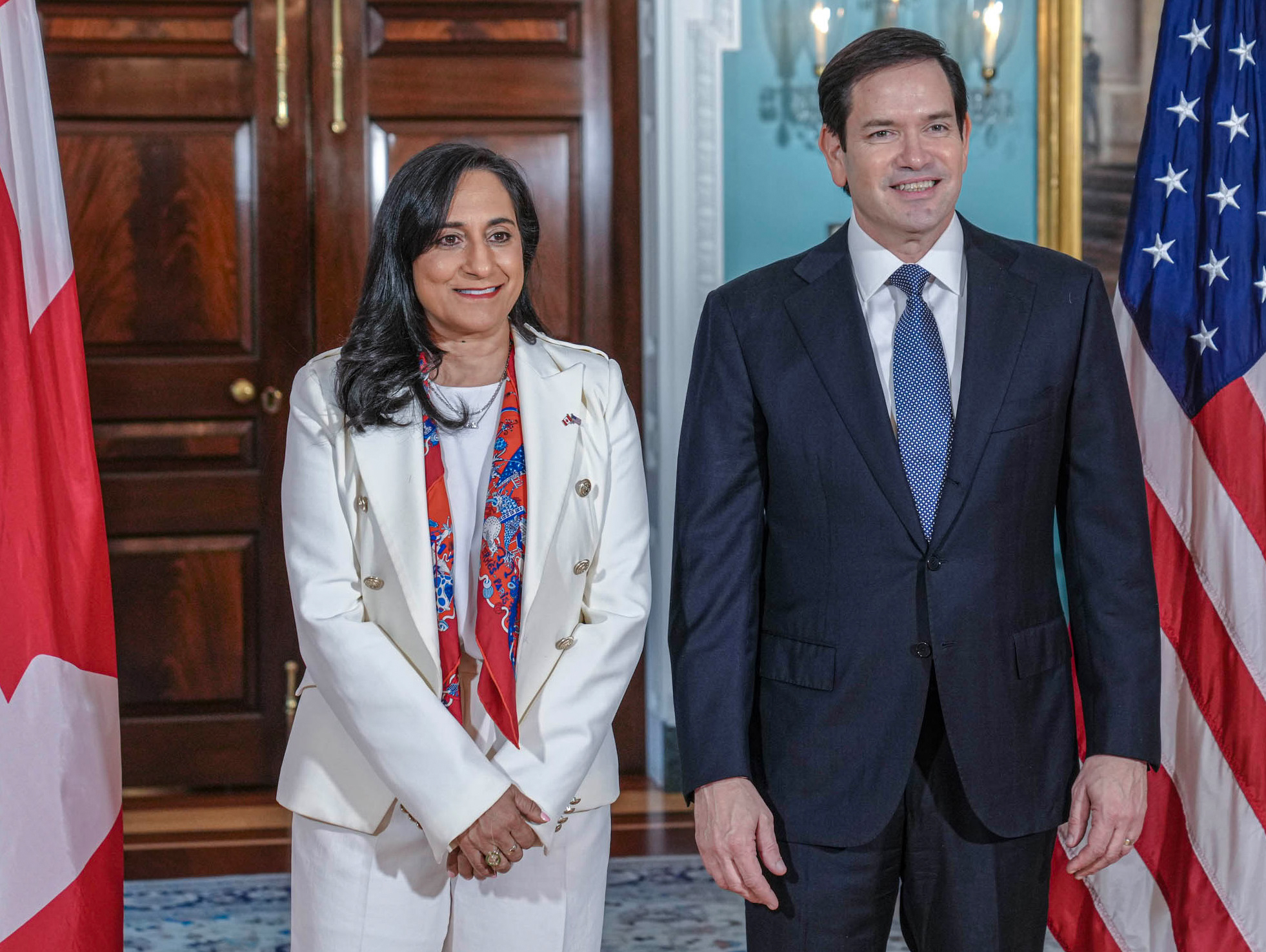
Anand with Marco Rubio in August 2025

Following the 2025 federal election, Anand was appointed minister of foreign affairs in Mark Carney's reshuffled cabinet. Amidst the Twelve-Day War, Anand led assisted departure efforts for Canadians who were looking to leave the Middle East due to safety concerns. In October 2025, Anand condemned the mass killings and atrocities committed in El Fasher, Sudan, following the city's fall to the Rapid Support Forces (RSF). In January 2026, Anand strongly condemned the Iranian regime in response to the violent suppression of nationwide anti-government protests.

She led diplomatic engagement with the European Union on trade and defence procurement. In October 2025, Anand became the first Canadian minister to visit India in two years, following a diplomatic row. She met Indian prime minister Narendra Modi and sought to restore bilateral relations. In January 2026, she was part of the Canadian delegation to China.

On January 3, 2026, Anand officially reaffirmed that Canada does not recognize the legitimacy of Nicolás Maduro's regime in Venezuela. Anand signed a defence agreement with South Korea in February 2026.

On November 19, 2026, Anand visited Shenzhen, China, to discuss improving diplomatic and trade relations between Canada and China. This includes lifting tariffs and working on restoring travel access between the two nations.

== Personal life ==
In 1995, Anand married John Knowlton. They have lived in Oakville for 21 years, from 1997 to 1999 and since 2005. The couple have four children. Anand identifies as both a Tamil Canadian and Punjabi Canadian owing to both her parents' heritages.

Anand was awarded the 2022 Global Citizen Award by the United Nations Association in Canada.

== Electoral record ==
2025 Canadian federal election: Oakville East
** Preliminary results — Not yet official **
Party	Candidate	Votes	%	±%	Expenditures
Liberal	Anita Anand	31,129	51.01	+4.79	
Conservative	Ron Chhinzer	27,379	44.86	+5.43	
New Democratic	Hailey Ford	1,702	2.79	–6.61	
Green	Bruno Sousa	354	0.58	–1.06	
People's	Henry Karabela	334	0.55	–2.76	
United	Alicia Bedford	131	0.21	N/A	
Total valid votes/expense limit					
Total rejected ballots					
Turnout		61,029	73.48		
Eligible voters		83,060			
Liberal notional hold		Swing		–0.32	
Source: Elections Canada

2021 Canadian federal election: Oakville
Party	Candidate	Votes	%	±%	Expenditures
Liberal	Anita Anand	28,137	46.1	-0.2	
Conservative	Kerry Colborne	24,430	40.0	+0.9	
New Democratic	Jerome Adamo	5,373	8.8	+1.3	
People's	J.D. Meaney	1,970	3.2	+2.0	
Green	Oriana Knox	1,090	1.8	-3.9	
Total valid votes		61,000	99.5		
Total rejected ballots		330	0.5		
Turnout		61,330	68.3		
Eligible voters		89,757			
Liberal hold		Swing		-0.6	
Source: Elections Canada

2019 Canadian federal election: Oakville
Party	Candidate	Votes	%	±%	Expenditures
Liberal	Anita Anand	30,265	46.28	-3.11	$88,029.39
Conservative	Terence Young	25,561	39.08	-3.41	$98,290.90
New Democratic	Jerome Adamo	4,928	7.54	+1.62	none listed
Green	James Elwick	3,704	5.66	+3.47	$7,355.08
People's	JD Meaney	798	1.22		none listed
Christian Heritage	Sushila Pereira	145	0.22		none listed
Total valid votes/expense limit		65,401	99.26		
Total rejected ballots		487	0.74	+0.36	
Turnout		65,888	72.94	-0.51	
Eligible voters		90,334			
Liberal hold		Swing		+0.15	
Source: Elections Canada

29th Canadian Ministry (2015–2025) – Cabinet of Justin Trudeau
Cabinet posts (4)
Predecessor	Office	Successor
Carla Qualtrough	Minister of Public Services and Procurement; November 20, 2019 – October 26, 2021	Filomena Tassi
Harjit Sajjan	Minister of National Defence; October 26, 2021 – July 26, 2023	Bill Blair
Mona Fortier	President of the Treasury Board; July 26, 2023 – December 20, 2024	Ginette Petitpas Taylor
Pablo Rodriguez	Minister of Transport; September 19, 2024 – March 14, 2025	Chrystia Freeland
Order of precedence
Preceded by François-Philippe Champagne as Member of the Cabinet	Order of Precedence of Canada as Member of the Cabinet	Succeeded by Patty Hajdu as Member of the Cabinet
