= Oakville East =

Federal electoral district in Ontario, Canada

Ontario electoral district
- Interactive map of riding boundaries from the 2025 federal election

Federal electoral district
- Legislature: House of Commons
MP
Anita Anand
Liberal
- District created: 2023
- First contested: 2025
- Last contested: 2025
- District webpage: profile, map

Demographics
- Population (2021): 108,735
- Census division: Halton
- Census subdivision: Oakville (part)

Oakville East (French: Oakville-Est) is a federal electoral district in the Greater Toronto Area in Ontario, Canada. Its Oakville counterpart is the newly created Oakville West.

Following the 2022 Canadian federal electoral redistribution, it was first contested at the 2025 Canadian federal election.

== Geography ==
The district consists of parts of the Town of Oakville. It includes the portion north of a line running from the town's northwestern limit along Sixteen Mile Creek to Lake Ontario, then extending southeast to the town's southeastern boundary. It also specifically includes the area east of Sixteen Mile Creek.

== Demographics ==
According to the 2021 Canadian census

Languages: 61.1% English, 9.0% Mandarin, 3.7% Arabic, 2.7% Urdu, 2.0% French, 1.9% Spanish, 1.6% Cantonese, 1.4% Polish, 1.4% Portuguese, 1.4% Serbo-Croatian, 1.3% Punjabi, 1.2% Korean, 1.1% Italian, 1.1% Hindi

Religions: 49.0% Christian (26.6% Catholic, 3.8% Christian Orthodox, 3.4% Anglican, 3.0% United Church, 1.4% Presbyterian, 10.8% Other), 29.2% No religion, 12.3% Muslim, 4.9% Hindu, 2.2% Sikh, 1.3% Buddhist

Median income: $46,800 (2020)

Average income: $86,100 (2020)

Panethnic groups in Oakville East (2021)
Panethnic group	2021	
Panethnic group	Pop.	%
European (Note: Statistic includes all persons that did not make up part of a visible minority or an indigenous identity.)	56,080	52.11%
East Asian (Note: Statistic includes total responses of "Chinese", "Korean", and "Japanese" under visible minority section on census.)	17,210	15.99%
South Asian	16,765	15.58%
Middle Eastern (Note: Statistic includes total responses of "West Asian" and "Arab" under visible minority section on census.)	6,820	6.34%
African	3,120	2.9%
Southeast Asian (Note: Statistic includes total responses of "Filipino" and "Southeast Asian" under visible minority section on census.)	2,720	2.53%
Latin American	1,805	1.68%
Indigenous	520	0.48%
Other/multiracial (Note: Statistic includes total responses of "Visible minority, n.i.e." and "Multiple visible minorities" under visible minority section on census.)	2,585	2.4%
Total responses	107,625	98.97%
Total population	108,745	100%
Notes: Totals greater than 100% due to multiple origin responses. Demographics based on 2022 Canadian federal electoral redistribution riding boundaries.

== History ==
It was created in 2023 as "Oakville East" from parts of Oakville and Oakville North—Burlington.

Parliament	Years	Member	Party
Oakville East; Riding created from Oakville and Oakville North—Burlington
45th	2025–present	Anita Anand	Liberal

== Electoral results ==
2025 Canadian federal election
** Preliminary results — Not yet official **
Party	Candidate	Votes	%	±%	Expenditures
Liberal	Anita Anand	31,129	51.01	+4.79	
Conservative	Ron Chhinzer	27,379	44.86	+5.43	
New Democratic	Hailey Ford	1,702	2.79	–6.61	
Green	Bruno Sousa	354	0.58	–1.06	
People's	Henry Karabela	334	0.55	–2.76	
United	Alicia Bedford	131	0.21	N/A	
Total valid votes/expense limit					
Total rejected ballots					
Turnout		61,029	73.48		
Eligible voters		83,060			
Liberal notional hold		Swing		–0.32	
Source: Elections Canada

2021 federal election redistributed results
Party	Vote	%
Liberal	22,709	46.22
Conservative	19,376	39.43
New Democratic	4,619	9.40
People's	1,627	3.31
Green	806	1.64

== See also ==
- List of Canadian federal electoral districts
