= Anand Veeravagu =

American neurosurgeon

Anand Veeravagu is an American neurosurgeon at Stanford University Hospital and Clinics. In 2012, he was selected to serve as a White House Fellow and is focused on innovation in healthcare delivery, traumatic brain injury, mental health and suicide prevention initiatives.

== Education ==
Veeravagu graduated from Grapevine High School in 2001 where he played varsity tennis and competed nationally in policy debate. He subsequently obtained a Bachelor of Science in Biomedical Engineering with a concentration in electrical engineering and a minor in Multicultural and Regional Studies from Johns Hopkins University. He received his Doctor of Medicine from Stanford University, graduating with a concentration in bioengineering. During his senior year of medical school, Veeravagu completed neurosurgical rotations at Stanford University, Mayo Clinic, Johns Hopkins Hospital, and the Barrow Neurological Institute. He then matched and completed his neurological surgery residency at Stanford University.

== Surgical practice ==
After medical school Veeravagu completed his neurosurgical training at Stanford University, where he now practices as an attending neurosurgeon. At the Palo Alto Veterans Hospital, he cared for United States service members returning from Iraq (Operation Iraqi Freedom) and Afghanistan (Operation Enduring Freedom) with traumatic brain and spinal cord injuries. During this time, he was inspired to apply for The White House Fellowship which he eventually completed.

In 2011, Veeravagu traveled to Uganda where he staffed the CURE Pediatric Neurosurgical Hospital helping care for children with birth-defects, hydrocephalus, spina bifida, and malignant brain tumors. Veeravagu has received over 30 awards for his leadership, research and promotion of healthcare access to underserved populations. In 2012 Veeravagu received the Gold Foundation's Humanism and Excellence in Teaching Award for his commitment to mentorship, training, and physician development.

Veeravagu's surgical interests include brain tumors, vascular malformations, and severe spine deformities.

== Clinical and basic science research ==
Glioblastoma Multiforme is the most common and malignant primary brain tumor in adults, and the focus of Veeravagu's research. He has written extensively on the treatment, management and diagnosis of brain tumors - including the development of a novel treatment in 2008.

Veeravagu's clinical research employs national databases to evaluate trends in health resource utilization to provide guidelines for policy reform. This extends to understanding the distribution, access, deployment and utilization of high-value healthcare resources. Veeravagu's recent dedication to opioid use and tolerance after spine surgery makes use of national databases to quantify trends and help identify dependence characteristics. Veeravagu has over 50 peer-reviewed manuscripts, book chapters, and articles. Anand has also written for media outlets such as the Huffington Post and The Daily Beast. Anand has also appeared on multiple news networks, including CNN, to discuss issues surrounding America's health.

== White House Fellowship ==
Starting in 2012, Veeravagu is a White House Fellow serving as a Special Assistant to the Secretary of Defense.

== Books ==
Books that profile Anand, his colleagues, and their work include:

- Controversies in Neuro-Oncology: Best Evidence for Brain Tumor Surgery by Alfredo Quinones-Hinojosa and Shaan M. Raza.
- Atlas of Emergency Neurosurgery. Thieme Medical Publishers 2012.
- Schmidek and Sweet: Operative Neurosurgical Techniques 2-Volume Set: Indications, Methods and Results by Alfredo Quinones-Hinojosa.
- Radiosurgery in the Management of Central Nervous System Disease Editors Kleinberg, Rigamonti, Hsu, and Lim.
- Tumors of the Central Nervous System by M.A. Hayat
