= Anand Dev Bhatt =

Nepali politician (1936–2021)

Ananda Dev Bhatta

Personal details
- Born: October 1936 Jumla District, Karnali Province, Nepal
- Died: 30 August 2021 (aged 84) Kathmandu
- Party: Nepal Communist Party
- Spouse: Sushila Bhatta
- Children: 2
- Occupation: Writer, politician, professor

Ananda Dev Bhatta (Nepali: आनन्ददेव भट्ट; October 1936 – 30 August 2021) was a Nepali literaturist and politician, belonging to the Communist Party of Nepal (Unified Marxist-Leninist). He was the President of the Progressive Writers' Movement.

== Education ==
Bhatta completed his master's degree in English Literature in 1960 in Patna University, India. He received his post-graduate diploma from The University of Leeds in West Yorkshire, England in 1982. He received his Master's in Education degree from The University of London in 1983.

Bhatta contested the 1999 election in the Baitadi-2 constituency, coming second with 7611 votes.
