= Anand Naidoo =

South African television anchor and correspondent

Anand Naidoo is a South African television anchor and correspondent for CGTN America based in Washington, DC.

== Career ==
Naidoo began his career as a newspaper journalist on The Rand Daily Mail in Johannesburg. He has also worked as a news editor on Radio 702, a Johannesburg independent radio station and a presenter on the South African cable station, M-Net.

Naidoo was the evening news anchor for the SABC in Johannesburg, South Africa. He began his broadcast career in Belgium, where he worked as a field producer for Belgian television as well as a producer and anchor for the Belgian Radio World Service.

Naidoo hosts CGTN America's daily political talk show, The Heat. He joined CGTN America in October 2012 after six years as an anchor for Al Jazeera English, and ten years at CNN International's World News anchor prior.

== Awards and honours ==
Naidoo is the recipient of the George Peabody award for coverage of Hurricane Katrina and the Alfred I. duPont-Columbia University Award for coverage of the tsunami disaster in South East Asia. In April 2015, he was awarded the Bronze World Medal for Best News Anchor at the New York Festivals International TV and Film Awards. He was awarded the Bronze Medal again for Best News Anchor at the New York Festivals TV & Film awards in April 2018 for his interview with John Nixon, the CIA agent who interrogated Saddam Hussein shortly after the Iraqi leader was captured by US forces.

Naidoo received the New York Telly Award in May 2023 for his reporting on a CGTN America network series on climate change.
