= Ruchi Anand =

Indian-born academic and author

- Born: India
- Occupation(s): University professor, author
- Known for: International relations

Ruchi Anand is an Indian-born academic and author living in France. She has authored or contributed to several books in the field of international relations and environmental politics and teaches international relations in France and the United States.

== Education and career ==
Ruchi Anand was born in India. She studied at the Lady Shri Ram College for Women at the University of Delhi and at Jawaharlal Nehru University in New Delhi, before moving to the United States to conduct her graduate studies at Purdue University. There she obtained her PhD in political science, focusing on the disparities of environmental justice between developed and developing countries. This work became the basis of her first book, International Environmental Justice: A North-South Dimension (London: Ashgate, 2004).

Anand is currently a professor at the American Graduate School in Paris, France, where she teaches courses on international relations, gender studies and environmental politics, and co-teaches a course on NGO management along with Jean-Marie Fardeau, France Director of Human Rights Watch, and NGO specialist Solène Edouard. Anand also regularly teaches courses through the Junior Statesmen of America summer programs at Princeton University, Stanford University and Georgetown University. She also teaches and lectures at several other campuses such as INSEEC and CEFAM in Lyon; Chambre de Commerce and IUT/IAE in Valence >, and at the University of California in Paris. She serves as an Associate Editor for New York-based peer-reviewed journal called ‘Environmental Justice.’ She has appeared in several documentaries and television interviews on various subjects of her expertise. Her prominent appearance in France was in December 2016 when she was interviewed for a Documentary by Maximal Production called ‘L'inquiétant Monsieur Trump’ on France 5 - Le monde en face about the then newly elected President Donald Trump. Another noteworthy documentary in which she appeared is ‘The Illusionist’ by Italian film-maker Elena Rossini. Anand's research interests include international relations, international law, international organizations, foreign policy, environmental policy, politics of developing countries and women's studies.

Ruchi Anand gave a TEDx talk at the ISC Paris on 16 September 2023 which problematizes the idea of home and identity. It talkes about people who have wandered so far away from home that they don't know where home is anymore. The talk got a standing ovation as it gives solutions by using the Japanese art of Kintsugi to piece together 'home' which she argues is a 2-letter word - ME.

The talk is available at:

https://www.youtube.com/watch?v=4XkqDWbuVbw&t=388s

== Bibliography ==
- Self Defense in International Relations. New York: Palgrave MacMillan. 2009. ISBN 978-0-230-57458-8.
- International Environmental Justice: A North-South Dimension. Aldershot, Hants, England; Burlington, VT: Ashgate. 2003. ISBN 978-0-7546-3824-7.
