= Anand Jon =

Indian-born American fashion designer convicted of rape (born 1973)

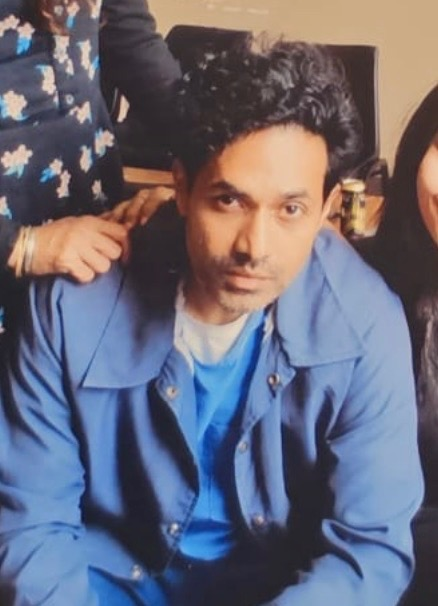
- Jon in 2023
- Born: Anand Jon Alexander; Kerala, India
- Occupations: Fashion designer and company director
- Parent: Shashi Abraham
- Status: Incarcerated
- Penalty: 59+ years

Anand Jon Alexander, professionally known as Anand Jon, is an Indian-born American fashion designer convicted of rape and other sex offenses.

Jon appeared on America's Next Top Model and was listed in Newsweek magazine's "Who's Next in 2007?".

In November 2008, Jon was convicted at the Los Angeles Court on one count of rape and multiple counts of lesser sexual offenses. He was sentenced to 59 years to life. Jon was facing similar charges in New York and Texas, but before the trial began in 2013, the New York prosecutors accepted his guilty plea, and he was sentenced to time served. Jon successfully resolved the overlapping out of state cases in NY and TX on the very same charges in CA, and is currently appealing his conviction in Federal Court for his release in CA.

== Career ==
Jon was born in Kerala, India. At 16, he won a scholarship to the Art Institute of Fort Lauderdale, Florida, and moved to United States. He moved to New York and joined Parsons The New School for Design making the transition from fine art to fashion. Upon graduating from Parsons, where the Associate Dean was Tim Gunn, Jon launched his debut collection "Amazone" in 1999. Jon credits Gianni Versace for his start in the fashion world.

Jon attracted celebrities, socialites and royalty as clients, some of whom debuted as models on his runway shows and projects, including Michelle Rodriguez, Amanda Hearst and Lydia Hearst, Paris Hilton and Nicky Hilton, and others. "If you were a wannabe, he was the perfect tailcoat to ride on", according to Catherine Saxton, a fashion publicist in New York.

In 2006 Jon founded a denim design company Jeanisis Fashion Inc., and the same year he received capitalization from the Joseph Stevens & Co. Inc. investment firm.

== Arrest and conviction ==
Jon was arrested in March 2007 in Beverly Hills, California, on rape and related charges. He pleaded not guilty to all charges. He had no prior felony convictions. The prosecutors accused Jon of luring women and girls to his apartment under the pretext of securing modeling jobs. Jon claimed that the sexual activity was consensual, and that one minor who accused him of rape had lied about her age.

On November 13, 2008, he was convicted on one count of rape of an adult woman as well as fifteen counts of sexual assault and other charges including unlawful conduct and contributing to delinquency of minors. In July 2009 the judge denied Jon's request for a new trial. Jon dismissed his attorneys before his sentencing as he suspected that they were in collaboration with the prosecutors. He represented himself for the sentencing phase of the proceedings. On August 31, 2009, Jon was sentenced to 59 years to life.

Jon was also indicted in Texas and New York on multiple charges alleging sexual assault. All but one of the charges were dropped in the New York trial.

=== Los Angeles case controversy ===
Jon maintains that during his trial, juror No. 12 was not an impartial juror. Alvin Dymally, juror No.12, made contact with Jon’s sister Sanjana during the trial. Superior Court Judge David Wesley determined Dymally appeared to want a romantic relationship with her when he spoke to her by phone and offered his help. Judge Wesley found both Sanjana and juror no. 12 in contempt of court.

Jon was convicted in November 2009 of 14 counts including forcible rape. He was found not guilty of four felonies, and jurors could not reach a verdict on three counts.

Due to his fellow jurors' anger, juror No. 12 claims he felt pressured to give a verdict that he did not want to give. During deliberations, other jurors had complained about juror No. 12, that it seemed he had already made up his mind to convict Jon. Although a request from the juror No. 12 be removed for refusal to deliberate, the request was denied by Judge Wesley.

Also during jury deliberations and before the verdict, juror No. 12 was flirty with the defendant's sister, Sanjana. due to fear of angering juror No. 12, Sanjana called the phone number he handed to her during the trial. after Sanjana refused to meet him, juror No. 12 changed his vote from not guilty to guilty. Before a verdict was reached, juror No. 12 re-initiated contact with Sanjana, once again requesting she meet him. She recorded the phone call. After Sanjana informed the court, she was instructed to schedule a meeting connected to a wire. Prior to the scheduling meeting, juror No. 12 was intercepted by District Attorney Investigators informing him of the criminal investigation he was under, thus sabotaging the plan.

Regarding his actions, juror No. 12 faced questioning under oath, where he testified to have never made attempts to speak to Jon’s sister. Defence attorneys presented a recording of their conversation, with the phone records, proving the juror falsely testified.

Juror No. 12 pleaded the Fifth Amendment to "not further incriminate himself" for perjury. Judge Wesley refused to consider or hold evidentiary hearings in the matter and the request for a new trial was denied.

Jon asserts there were inconsistencies in the victims’ testimonies. During the trial, it was shown that the lead detective destroyed evidence crucial to Jon’s case and did not follow up with alleged victims that had said Jon never sexually assaulted them.

Jon's mother Shashi Abraham and his sister Sanjana Jon have urged the governments of the US and India to intervene and grant a new trial.

== Personal life ==
Jon is a nephew of Indian classical musician and playback singer K. J. Yesudas.

Jon has been involved in charity projects such as Universe Aids awareness tour to India with his sister Sanjana.

Jon was named cultural ambassador of India for his contribution to fashion. He has won "Rising Star Award" for Fashion week of the Americas, "Designer of the Year" at Vancouver Fashion Week. He was celebrity host for MTV Asia and VH1’s Awesomely Bad Fashions. He has appeared on America's Next Top Model with Tyra Banks and on E! with Paris Hilton.

Anand Jon was among 30 selected for the first of a kind Cal State HUX master's degree for the incarcerated starting fall 2023.
