= Priti Paintal =

Indian-British composer and producer (born 1960)

Priti Paintal (born 1960) is a British composer, performer, music producer and promoter who lives and works in England.

== Life ==
Paintal was born in New Delhi, India, the daughter of the distinguished Indian scientist Autar Singh Paintal. She trained in both Indian and Western music and studied sitar and tabla as a child and piano and composition in India. Paintal received a master's degree in ethnomusicology before moving to England to study composition at York University and the Royal Northern College of Music in Manchester with Anthony Gilbert.

She founded the ensemble ShivaNova in 1988 to unite diverse musical traditions into a global sound. The ensemble collaborates with artists including storytellers, jugglers, dancers and orchestras, and provides workshops in schools and communities. A mainstream dance music spin-off of the group, SugarNova, had its debut single "Over and Over" reach the top 20 of the Music Week Club charts.

Her music brings together traditional, classical and jazz performers in a unique mix of Indian roots and contemporary flair. In addition to her group pieces she wrote the mini-opera Survival Song for the Royal Opera House Garden Venture contemporary opera programme, which was shortlisted for the Olivier Awards. It led to the full-length opera Biko, staged in London and Birmingham, the Royal Opera House's first commission from an Asian and a woman composer. Other performers have included the Philharmonia Orchestra in the premiere of "Secret Chants", the title track of ShivaNova’s latest CD, and she has written works for the City of London Sinfonia, Bournemouth Sinfonietta, East of England Orchestra, the Balanescu and Bingham string quartets, the Park Lane Sextet, and numerous singers and instrumentalists. Some of Priti's work is held in the British Music Collection Archive at Heritage Quay University of Huddersfield.

Priti has written for The Guardian newspaper, and been featured in The Independent and The Daily Telegraph. She has appeared on Songlines, BBC 3 and Woman's Hour. She has served on the Arts Council Music panel, the board of South-East Arts, the board of Kent Music.

== Works ==
Selected works include:

- Grandharva Music I

Polygamy, Urban Mantras, Flying to the Sun, Moonlighting, Seventh Heaven (CDs)

- Secret Chants (orchestral work and CD)
- Survival Song, chamber opera

Biko (full-length opera based on the life of Apartheid leader Stephen Biko)

- Gulliver in Lilliput, children's opera
- Bananas, multimedia show
- Global Feast, multi-artform
