= Margot Anand =

French writer, teacher, seminar leader and public speaker

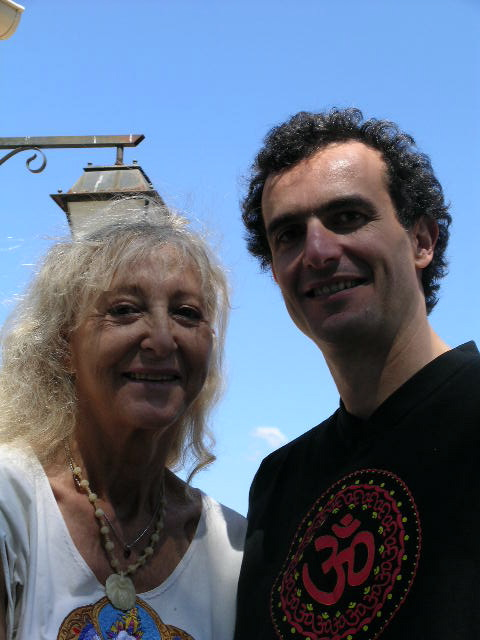
- Margot Anand with Philippe Levy
- Born: 27 July 1944 (age 82); Paris
- Education: University of Paris
- Occupations: Author; teacher
- Notable work: The Art of Sexual Ecstasy; The Art of Sexual Magic; The Art of Everyday Ecstasy
- Website: www.margotanand.com

Margot Anand (French: [maʁɡo anɑ̃]; born 27 July 1944) is a French writer, teacher, seminar leader and public speaker. She has written numerous books including The Art of Sexual Ecstasy; The Art of Everyday Ecstasy; and The Art of Sexual Magic. Her mother was Protestant, and her father was Russian Orthodox and she was raised in Orthodox religion.

Margot (or "Margo") Anand (Sanskrit "Ananda"=Bliss) received her degree from the Sorbonne in Paris. She began her writing career as a journalist covering the American pop culture scene for French magazines, after which she retreated from public life for an extended period to study tantra and related disciplines. Osho Rajneesh was her tantra teacher when she learned it in India in the late 1970s. She began to teach tantra at Osho's ashram in Pune and subsequently became notable as one of the first teachers to introduce tantra and Neotantra to a broad public in Europe and the United States. She designed a practice called "SkyDancing Tantra" that is promoted as a tantric practice.

Anand taught as adjunct faculty with Deepak Chopra at his seminars and conferences for several years and has taught at Dean Ornish's annual retreats for heart patients.

== Bibliography ==
=== Books ===
- —— (1989). The Art of Sexual Ecstasy: The Path of Sacred Sexuality for Western Lovers. Tarcher. ISBN 9780874775815.
- —— (1996). The Art of Sexual Magic. Tarcher. ISBN 9780874778403.
- —— (1998). The Art of Everyday Ecstasy: The Seven Tantric Keys. Broadway Books. ISBN 9780767901642.
- —— (2000). Sexual Ecstasy: The Art of Orgasm. Tarcher. ISBN 9781585420285.
- —— (2005). The Sexual Ecstasy Workbook. Tarcher. ISBN 9781585423972.

=== Introductions ===
- —— (2002). The Kama Sutra of Vatsyayana. Introduction by Margot Anand, Translation by Richard Francis Burton. Modern Library. ISBN 9780375759246.

=== DVDs, videos, and audio ===
- Margot Anand's Secret Keys to the Ultimate Love Life (3 DVD set)
- The Art of Orgasm – The Multi-Orgasmic Couple (for Men & Women)
- Everyday Ecstasy: Music for Passion, Spirit (music CD)
- Sexual Magic Meditations: Cultivating Sexual Energy to Transform Your Life (audio cassette) (September 1996) Sounds True ISBN 9781564553607
- SkyDancing Tantra: A Call to Bliss (music CD)
