= Anand Tummala =

Indian cricketer

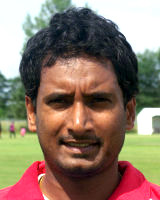
- Anand Tummala
- Born: October 21, 1978 (age 47); Vuyyuru, India
- Other names: T. Anand
- Occupation: Cricketer

Anand Tummala (born 21 October 1978 in Vuyyuru, Andhra Pradesh, India) also known as T. Anand, is a cricketer for the United States .

== Career ==
Anand first appeared in the United States national cricket team as an all-rounder in 2011 in the Etihad T20 Cricket Tournament hosted by Cricket Canada in King City, Ontario (11–15 and 16 August 2011). On his debut, his bowling figures were 1 maiden, 10 runs, and 2 wickets from 3 overs against arch-rivals Canada. In his second match against Trinidad and Tobago, his figures were 2 for 24 in 4 overs.

Anand went on to be part of the USA Cricket Team in the historical K.A. Auty Trophy 2-day match, played on 15 - 16 August 2011, held at Toronto Cricket, Skating & Curling Club (which dates back to 1844 between the US and Canada). His figures in the K.A. Auty Trophy were 25 overs, 97 runs, 3 maidens and 3 wickets. Anand scored 88 runs in the match, with 63 being his highest in the second innings.

Anand also played First-class cricket in India (Ranji Trophy) for Delhi in 2001–02 and has also played Premier League cricket in South Wales, UK. He completed his Schooling from Sardar Patel Vidyalaya, New Delhi, and college from St. Stephen's College, Delhi University.

He acquired Level I and level II cricket coaching certifications from the England & Wales Cricket Board during his stay at the University of Wales, Newport, where he completed his MBA in 2007. He was appointed coach and captain for the University of Wales, Newport Cricket team and went on to be signed as senior coach and player for Croesyceiliog Cricket Club in South Wales Premier League, UK.

He has also worked closely with Bishan Singh Bedi (former Indian team coach and captain) while he represented Bishan Bedi Cricket Coaching Trust teams in England and Australia.

In August 2016, Anand was named the head coach for the USA Women's Cricket Development Squad and USA Women's Cricket Team against the touring Marylebone Cricket Club (MCC) Women's team. He was also named assistant coach for USA Men's Cricket Team in October 2016, with Pubudu Dassanayake as the head coach. USA Men's cricket team went on to win the World Cricket League (WCL) Division 4 championship in October–November 2016.
