= Thaminder Singh Anand =

American researcher

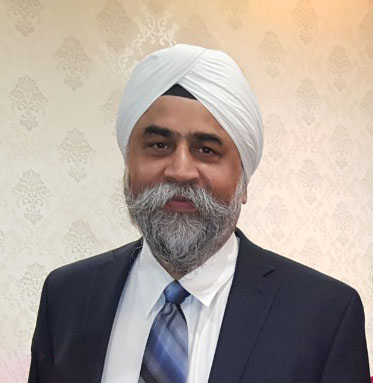
- Born: 30 September 1957 (age 67)
- Known for: Excommunication by Akal Takht

Thaminder Singh Anand is a controversial US-based Sikh researcher who was excommunicated from the Sikh faith by the Akal Takht (the highest authority in Sikhism) and the SGPC.

== Career ==
He has translated the Guru Granth Sahib, the holy religious text of Sikhism, into eight different languages, including French, English, Arabic, Telugu, Oriya, Gujarati, and Hindi with a team of 50 translators from all over the world. He also created two websites for the Sikh community, providing a collection of Sikh literature, including rare handwritten copies of the Guru Granth Sahib.

== Excommunication by the Akal Takht ==
His work caused controversy and he was expelled from the Sikh religion by Akal Takht, one of the highest authorities in Sikhism. However, he has still continued to carry on with his work.
