= K. K. Anand =

Indian management consultant (1930-2013)

Dr. (Prof) K. K. Anand

Kewal Krishan Anand (22 June 1930 - 22 January 2013) was a management consultant in India. After completing his post-doctoral training at Harvard University in the US, he returned to India as founding Professor at IIM Ahmedabad from 1965 to 1969. Thereafter, he set up the HR department at Larsen & Toubro, a large industrial group in India, as founding Chief Organization Manager from 1969 to 1973. Finally, he founded his consulting firm Anand & Associates in Bombay and was a management thinker in India from the 1970s till 2000 advising large corporations, family businesses and non-profit organizations.

He was very active in management associations and organized conferences on leadership, management and quality. He authored 4 management books.

== Early life ==
Dr. KK Anand was born in Gujranwala in pre-partition India. He was the eldest of 8 children, 4 boys and 4 girls. He educated himself and most of his family as the eldest sibling of a refugee family in Delhi.

== Education ==
After completion of his Doctorate in Psychology from Punjab University, he pursued his Post-Doctoral studies at The University of Tennessee and the Harvard Business School. He was a Fulbright Scholar and recipient of the Ford Foundation Fellowship.

== Career ==
Position Held	Where	Years
Civilian Psychologist of the Officers Selection Board	Indian Army and Indian Navy	1958–1962
Post Doctoral Training in the US	Harvard University and University of Tennessee	1962-1965
Founding Professor of Human Behaviour in Organizations; and Chairman of Admissions Committee	Indian Institute of Management Ahmedabad	1965-1969
Founding Chief Personnel & Organization Manager	Larsen & Toubro	1969-1973
Management Consultant. Founder and Chairman	Anand & Associates and KK Anand Consultants Pvt. Ltd.	1973-2000

In a license-raj era in India, he focussed on three core areas:

1. professional management as a science that all organizations, especially family run businesses, must embrace for long-term success;
2. leadership and human resource management as key to building successful corporations;
3. quality management systems to make India compete globally and domestically against international corporations.

Anand & Associates became an Indian management consulting firm doing work in the above areas. Dr Anand and his team of consultants advised some of India's large corporate groups such as Godrej & Boyce, MUSCO (Mahindra Group), Anand Group, L&T, MTDC, Maharashtra Textile Corporation, Aptech, Hindustan PhotoFilms, Century Rayon (BK Birla Group), Jaslok Hospital. He also advised Bank of Baroda, Blue Star, Cable Corporation of India, Engineers India, Emco, Fedders Lyoyd, Fiberglass Pilkington, Hindustan Aeronautics Ltd., Indian Oil Corporation, Metal Box, Punjab National Bank, Richardson Hindustan, Swadeshi Polytex, Tube Investments India and many more. He advised Air India, and came away a firm believer that Government should not run business.

== Institutions ==
Dr Anand invested his time also in Associations focussed on management:

- President, Management Consultants Association of India (now the Institute of Management Consultants of India)
- Chairman, Special Council for Quality, All India Manufacturer's Organization
- Founder & later President, National Centre for Quality Management
- President, Industrial Relations Institute of India
- Convenor, Conceptual Forum: Bombay Management Association
- President, Indian Hospital Association
- Honorary Secretary, National Kidney Foundation of India

Other Associations

- Chairman, Hospital Services Committee, Bombay Management Association
- Member, Panel of Experts, Voluntary Health Association of India
- Convener of 8 National Conferences on Hospital & Health Care Management
- Chairman, Management Education Committee, All India Management Association
- Executive Committee member, Indian Institute of Public Administration

== Books ==
Dr Anand authored 4 books:

- Management Consultancy - A User Guide: Management Consultancy was a new profession compared to the Accountants, Lawyers etc. The book was addressed to Indian companies on why and how a company can benefit from a management consultant. Foreword by SS Nadkarni, Chairman National Stock Exchange of India and Chairman of IDBI;
- Hospital Management - A New Perspective: Pre-90s, many hospitals were run by Doctors. Dr Anand believed that Indian hospitals had to bring in management trained leaders to run hospitals, instead of Doctors. This book explained why this change was necessary and how this could be brought about. Foreword by Dr Prathap C Reddy, chairman, Apollo Group of Hospitals;
- Quality Management Handbook: Pre-90s, India was considered as a country that produced poor quality goods that could not compete globally. Dr Anand invited the Japanese quality guru, Dr Genichi Taguchi, to India and advised and wrote about the importance of quality management systems;
- Human Resource Management: Dr Anand believed that people make organizations successful. This book covered the areas of industrial relations, leadership development and HR systems.
- Other Publications: - Managing Health Institutions - Hospital Management Case Studies - Studies in Hospital Management

== Visiting faculty ==
Dr. Anand taught as visiting faculty and also gave guest lectures across many educational institutions:

- Indian Institute of Management, Ahmedabad;
- Indian Institute of Technology, Bombay;
- J. Bajaj Institute of Management, Bombay.

== Family ==
Dr Anand's professional success was built on a family support system. Dr and Mrs Anand's three children and seven grandchildren all live in India in Mumbai and New Delhi. The eldest, Sanjiv Anand, founded and runs a management consulting firm, Cedar Consulting, advising global and Indian clients. Their daughter, Seema Singh, is a designer and homemaker. The youngest, Sumeet Anand, after 15 years in industry and a CEO, has set up an advisory and ventures firm, IndSight Growth Partners.
