= Harjit Singh Anand =

Indian politician

- Born: 1948 (age 77–78); Jalandhar, India
- Occupation: Director of National Krav Maga Federation

Harjit Singh Anand (born 1948 in Jalandhar) is a former officer of the 1973 batch of the Indian Administrative Service. He was an officer of Haryana cadre and was posted in senior positions in the State of Haryana and the Government of India, prior to his superannuation in 2008. He was promoted to Additional Secretary position in the Government of India back in 2006. He is also the former co-president of the EuroIndia Centre, Professor at the Centre for Study of Administration of Relief (Delhi) and President of the Working Group on Famine and Society of the International Sociological Association.

== Education ==
He did his Bachelor of Arts (B.A.) (Honours) in Political Science in 1969, followed by an Master of Arts (M.A) in Sociology in 1971 and then a Ph.D degree in Administration. He joined the Indian Administrative Service (IAS), and was an IAS officer of 1973 batch.

== Career ==
- Service with the International Labour Organization at its India Office for over two years as Mission Leader for the Informal Sector.
- Director General of the Haryana Institute of Public Administration from 2002 to 2005.
- As Member Secretary, leading the National Capital Region Planning Board to adopt an environmentally progressive policy and to finance innovative urban development projects with a Regional planning approach.
- Secretary, Ministry of Housing and Urban Poverty Alleviation of the Government of India, in which capacity he was instrumental in preparing the National Housing and Habitat Policy with a clear focus on social exclusion and inclusion and low income housing.
- Close association with the formulation of the National Street Vendors Policy, with refining India’s employment programmes for the urban poor and with implementing the Jawaharlal Nehru National Urban Renewal Mission.
- Close association with the drafting of the Nehru Rozgar Yojna launched by the Indian Prime Minister Rajiv Gandhi for improving the lot of the urban poor.
- Chairman of the committee which prepared a report on Housing – A new pattern of development based on Public-private partnership, commissioned by the Lt. Governor of Delhi.
- Chairman of the Center for the Study of Administration of Relief (CSAR). The CSAR is an NGO dealing with Food Security, Alienation, Marginalisation& Poverty, Inequality, Natural Calamities& man-made disasters and Exclusion.

Throughout his career, Anand has represented his country, often in a high-profile capacity, at various international events and bodies. Anand is a director of the National Krav Maga Federation (NKMF).
