= V. A. Sundaram =

Indian independence activist

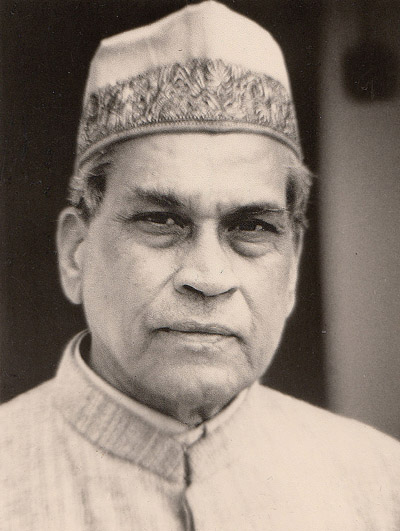
- V. A. Sundaram around 1957
- Born: 2 February 1896; Coimbatore, Madras Presidency, British India (now Tamil Nadu, India)
- Died: 11 March 1967 (aged 71); Bombay (now Mumbai), Maharashtra, India
- Spouse: Savitri (1909–1968)
- Children: Pushpa, Ramakrishna, Vivekanand, Saraswati, Padma

Vellalore Annaswamy Sundaram (2 February 1896 – 11 March 1967) was an activist in the Indian Independence movement, an associate of Mahatma Gandhi, a confidant of Madan Mohan Malaviya, and a fundraiser and secretary to the Benares Hindu University (BHU). His work focused on communication and public relations, with particular emphasis on an international and intercultural perspective.

His personal theme in life was an appreciation of beauty, on a sensual level as well as in broader, ethical and spiritual terms.

== Early life ==
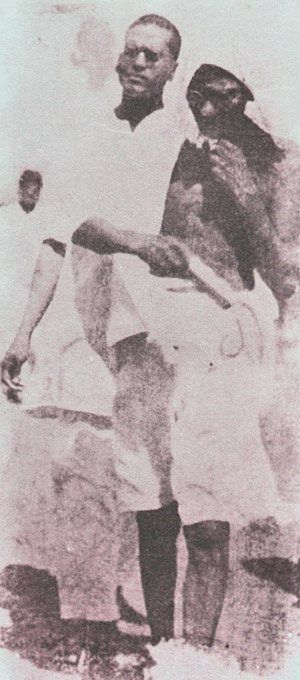
With Gandhi in early May 1930

Sundaram was born in the South Indian city of Coimbatore to a family of orthodox Tamil Brahmins tracing their ancestry back to the 16th century Sanskrit scholar Appayya Dikshita. Sundaram's father Annaswamy Iyer, an advocate, hailed from the nearby village of Vellalore and, as customary in Tamil Nadu, Sundaram's name included the place of origin and the father's name (hence Vellalore Annaswamy or V. A. Sundaram).

Sundaram took an early interest in literature and poetry, and developed a passion for the English language. After completing high school he enrolled in the renowned Pachaiyappa's College in Madras to study English literature. Halfway through his studies, he was captivated by the ideas of the Indian Independence movement and attended a meeting of the Indian National Congress for the first time in December 1914 in Madras.

== An Independence activist ==
When Sundaram heard Gandhi delivering a speech in Madras in April 1915, he instantly decided to give up his studies and to follow Gandhi as a disciple. Impressed by the 19-year-old's fervour, Gandhi took him along to Ahmedabad, where Sundaram was to become one of the first inmates of Gandhi's newly founded Sabarmati Ashram. Gandhi's ashram discipline and dietary regime, however, proved too hard for Sundaram and, suffering from malnutrition, he left after 9 months.

Based at Coimbatore and Madras, Sundaram began implementing Gandhi's concept of village development, introducing weaving and spinning activities at Vellalore. Gandhi employed him as a regional worker for various activities in the South. Gandhi's Circular letter of October 1919, calling for a nationwide hartal with reference to the Khilafat movement was addressed to 28 of India's leading Independence activists, among them Motilal and Jawaharlal Nehru, C. Rajagopalachari, C. F. Andrews, Rajendra Prasad, and also V. A. Sundaram.

Sundaram built up close and cordial relationships with leading Independence activists of Tamil Nadu, namely C. Rajagopalachari, C. Vijayaraghavachariar and Sir Subramania Iyer. Under their guidance and with Gandhi's support, he engaged in the cause of the Bengal internments of 1917, in the Vaikom Satyagraha of 1925, the Salt Satyagraha of 1930 and the civil disobedience campaigns of 1930 and 1931.

He was arrested in Madras in early 1931 – an incident that attracted considerable public attention and prompted Gandhi to send a note of protest to Viceroy Lord Irwin as well as a press statement to Reuters.

Sundaram participated in the Independence struggle by publishing articles and letters in many of India’s English newspapers, like Gandhi's Young India, the Modern Review, The Hindu, The Independent, New India, Amrita Bazar Patrika and in later years the Bhavan's Journal. His message of high ideals and fervent patriotism, typically presented in an emotional and passionate language, made him a successful public speaker, and some of his later speeches were broadcast on All India Radio.

== Gandhi's ambassador to Europe ==
Prior to attending the second Round Table Conference in London, Gandhi decided to send Sundaram to Europe as an ambassador of his political message. Sponsored by the industrialist Jamnalal Bajaj, Sundaram left India in June 1931 for a 7-month journey through Europe.

In Italy he met Mussolini and Pope Pius XI and elucidated Gandhi's message through the Giornale d'Italia. In Germany he held public speeches in Kassel and Berlin and met Albert Einstein whom he was introduced to by Wilfrid Israel, in Caputh. Introduced to Gandhi's ideas through Sundaram, Einstein wrote a letter to the Mahatma, which Sundaram was asked to transmit.

Sundaram travelled to Switzerland, France and Czechoslovakia and met President Tomáš Masaryk in Prague. Continuing to England, he joined Gandhi in London in the wake of the second Round Table Conference. He accompanied Madan Mohan Malaviya, the educationist, on study trips to institutions like Harrow, Cambridge and Oxford.

In the course of his European tour, Sundaram met numerous writers, intellectuals, artists and political activists, among them Stephen Spender, Arthur Mee, Christopher Isherwood, Birger Forell, Wilfrid Israel, André Maurois, Paul Birukoff, Franziska Standenath and Piero Misciattelli. In this way he was able to strengthen international knowledge about Gandhi’s philosophy and his political message.

== With Madan Mohan Malaviya and the BHU ==
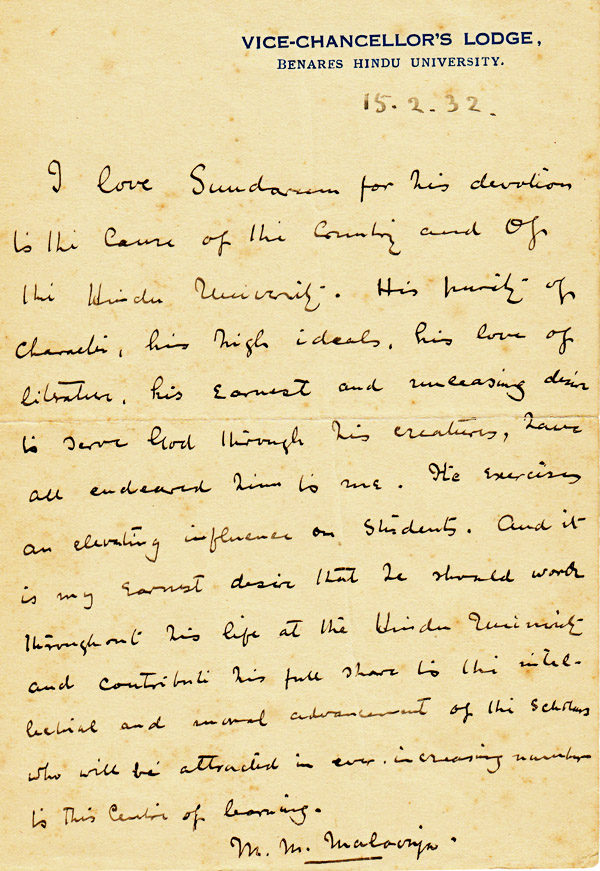
Sundaram as Secretary of the BHU Collection Committee (photo of late 1930s) and Malaviya's appreciation of his work (Certificate of 15 Feb 1932)

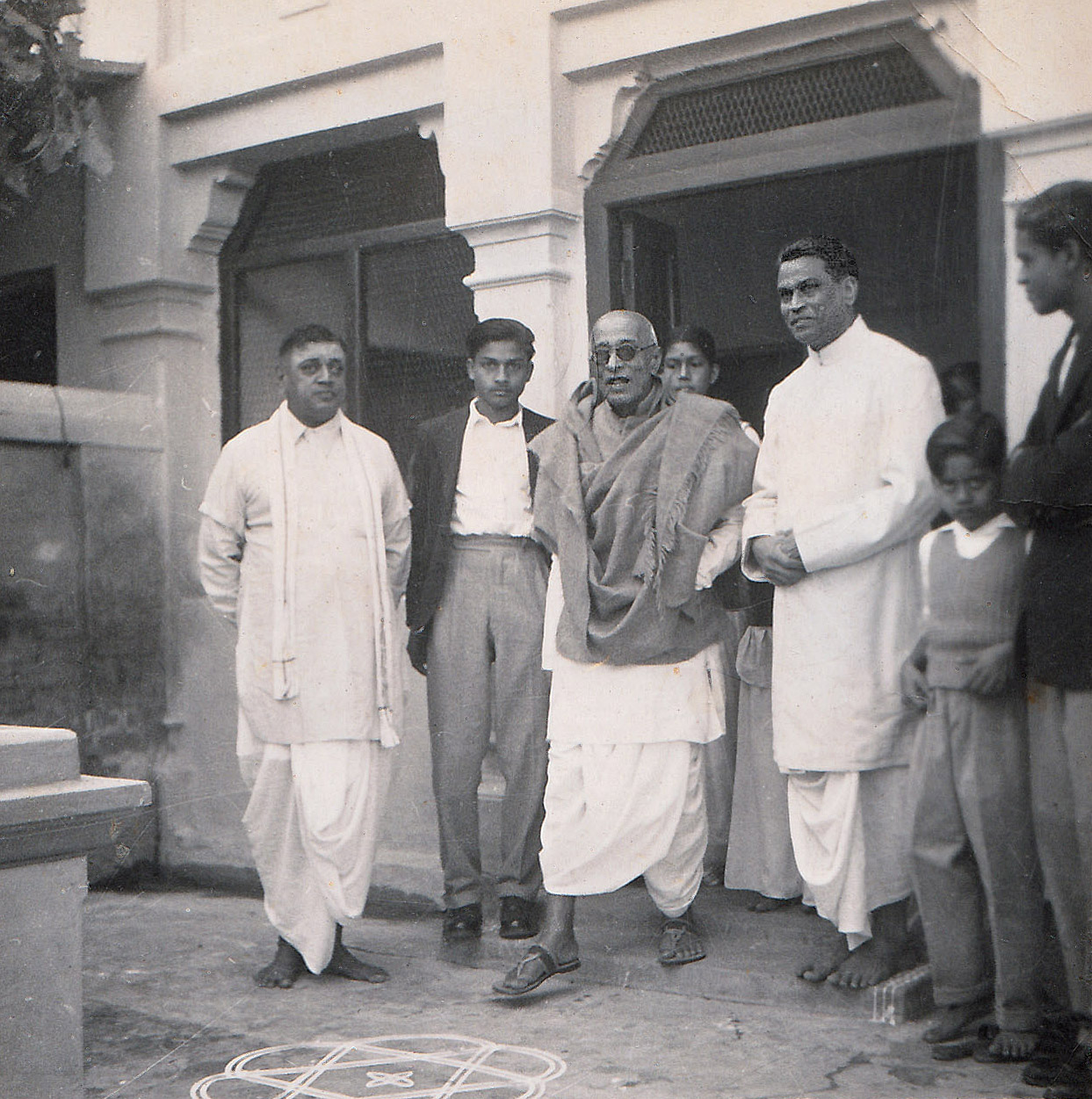
Governor-General of India C. Rajagopalachari visiting Sundaram and family in his house 'Krishnakutir' on BHU grounds in 1948

In 1916, during a visit to Benares, Sundaram had first become acquainted with Madan Mohan Malaviya‘s project of setting up a new university here, the Benares Hindu University. Intrigued by the project's patriotic and educational vision, Sundaram answered Malaviya’s call to Benares in January 1926 and became his personal secretary.

Malaviya's first assignment was to send him to Kotgarh in the Himalayan mountains, where Samuel Evans Stokes, an American friend of Malaviya's had set up a school and was in need of a qualified English teacher. Sundaram, accompanied by his newly married wife Savitri, joined Stokes for one season in 1926, a time during which he was in close contact with Gandhi, sending him every week a letter containing "noble thoughts" (which Gandhi would carefully retain and, years later, would present to Sundaram as a complete collection).

Back in Benares, Sundaram's primary focus of work as Malaviya's assistant became the task of raising funds for the emerging university. He developed a particular aptitude for approaching and engaging high-profile donors, such as the Maharadjas or 'Ruling Princes' of different parts of India. As Secretary of the BHU Collection Committee he gained some fame for raising funds in the range of lakhs.

This work involved extensive travelling through India, some of which Sundaram did together with Malaviya. Both were affectionately connected through a firm belief in God and the conviction to be serving a righteous, noble mission.

Malaviya had a house built for Sundaram on the grounds of the university, close to his own house. Sundaram named it 'Krishnakutir' and here welcomed many prominent guests from India and abroad, politicians like C. Rajagopalachari (as Governor-General of India in 1948), Sir Akbar Hydari and Mirza Ismail, writers like Somerset Maugham and Paul Brunton, the scientists C. V. Raman and K. S. Krishnan and, several times, Mahatma Gandhi. To mark the spot next to the house where Gandhi performed a prayer in 1942, Sundaram set up a memorial stone which can still be seen there today.

During his 30 years of service for the BHU, Sundaram published a range of books on the university and on its founder Malaviya. Many other private publications testify to Sundaram's lifelong passion for language and poetry as well as to his spiritual dedication.

== Personal life and legacy ==
A guiding theme through Sundaram's life and work was the concept of harmony and unity spreading beyond religious borders. From his youth he had taken a keen interest in Christian culture and philosophy, later his house in Benares hosted many Christian as well as Muslim guests, and he exchanged thoughts and letters on interreligious ideas with Gandhi, Sadhu Sundar Singh and Swami Sivananda (a tie connecting him to the latter was also the common ancestor Appayya Dikshita).

Though at one point he fought virulently against the English, he always remained a passionate admirer of English culture and literature, and made great efforts in sending all his children to England for higher education.

In his last chapter of life, after retiring from the BHU in 1956, Sundaram and his wife Savitri moved to Bombay and spent their final years together with their eldest son. Sundaram died in Bombay on 11 March 1967.

At Benares, his former house 'Krishnakutir', is today (in 2013) planned to become part of a 'Heritage Complex' on the BHU grounds, its title 'Gandhi Memorial' being derived from the memorial stone Sundaram set up in remembrance of his most prominent guest and lifelong personal mentor.

== Publications (selected) ==
- (Ed.) Benares Hindu University 1905–1935. Benares 1936. Online at Digital Library of India, Govt. of India
- Alma Mater. Benares 1940.
- Rabindranath Tagore. Benares 1941. Online at Internet Archive. Reprint 2011, Nabu Press, ISBN 978-1245206167
- (Ed.) Benares Hindu University 1916–1942, Silver Jubilee edition. Benares 1942. Online at Digital Library of India, Govt. of India
- Torchbearers (a series of two separate pamphlets on: Mahatma Gandhiji, Mahamana Malaviyaji). Benares 1948. Online access to the latter at BHU library, Mahamana Digital Library
- Homage to Malaviyaji. Benares 1949. Online at BHU library, Mahamana Digital Library

== Bibliography ==
- The Collected Works of Mahatma Gandhi (Electronic Book), New Delhi, Publications Division Government of India, 1999, 98 volumes. Available from various sources, e.g. gandiserve.org
- Ciano, Edda Mussolini (1977). My Truth. Morrow (p. 55. on Mussolini's daughter meeting Sundaram in 1929)
- Maugham, W. Somerset (1991). A Writer's Notebook (3rd ed.). Mandarin (about a visit to Sundaram's house in 1938)
- Rogister, Maximilian von (1964). Indien ist anders. Dörner, Düsseldorf (about a visit to Sundaram's house in the 1940s)
- Sharma, Asha (1999). An American in Khadi: The Definitive Biography of Satyanand Stokes. Penguin Books India (on Sundaram's mission to Kotgarh in 1926). Recent edition online An American in Gandhi's India. The Biography of Satyanand Stokes. (pp. 214–215)
- Shukla, Chandrashanker (Ed.) (1951). Reminiscences of Gandhiji. Vora & Co, Bombay (pp. 74–75. on a meeting with Sundaram shortly after Gandhi's death). Online at gandhi-manibhavan.org (Melville de Mellow, "A red rose")
- Winslow, Jack C. and Elwin, Verrier (1931). The Dawn of Indian Freedom. George Allen & Unwin Ltd., London (quoting Sundaram in a Madras court in 1931)
