= Vijay Anand (politician) =

Indian activist and politician

- Born: 7 March 1969 (age 57); Coimbatore, India
- Occupation: activist
- Known for: 5th Pillar

Vijay Anand (born 7 March 1969) is an anti-corruption activist from Coimbatore in Tamil Nadu, India. Anand formed the 5th Pillar organization whose goal is to fight corruption in Indian politics by fielding candidates who stand against corruption.

== Early life ==
Vijay Anand was born on 7 March 1969 in Coimbatore in Tamil Nadu. Anand went to the Government College of Technology (GCT) Coimbatore, India and later was employed as a software engineer.

== 5th Pillar ==
Anand formed the 5th Pillar organization in 2006 to fight against corruption in Indian politics. The organization's goal is to field candidates for the Parliament of India that take a stance against government corruption. The organization also plans to reach out to the segment of the population who abstain from voting due to the perceived lack of credible candidates.

== Politics ==
Anand ran in the 2011 Tamil Nadu Legislative Assembly election as a candidate for the Lok Satta Party from the Coimbatore South district.
