= Ashima Anand =

Medical investigator

Dr. Ashima Anand is the principal investigator and principal scientific officer in Vallabhbhai Patel Chest Institute, New Delhi. She has an expertise in respiratory medicine.

== Life ==
Dr. Ashima Anand was born on 27 July 1950 in Delhi and she did her schooling from Delhi and Srinagar. Later on she did her graduation in B.Sc from Miranda House College in 1969 and then her M.Sc from Department of Zoology in 1971 and she also completed her Ph.D from Vallabhbhai Patel Chest Institute in 1978, Delhi University. Post graduate and later collaborative were at Oxford University, Johns Hopkins University, Max-Planck Institute of Systemphysiologie, Dortmund, Prince of Wales Medical Research Institute, Sydney and Shiraz School of Medicine, Iran. Currently, she is working as Principal Investigator in DST's project on Exertional Breathlessness at V.P.Chest Institute, where she has worked for several years funded by DST, has several publications in peer-reviewed journals, international symposia proceedings and she has also co-edited two books.

== Honors and recognition ==
Dr. Anand is a fellow of the Committee on Ethics of the International Union of Physiological Sciences (IUPS) and helped set up collaborative research projects successfully with the Medical School in Shiraz (Iran). She is a Fellow of the Indian National Science Academy (INSA), National Academy of Medical Sciences (India) and the Academy of Sciences for the Developing World (TWAS); she is also an active Member of the Third World Organization of Women in Science and the Physiological Society, UK. She has been serving in INSA's Council and in committees for Science Promotion, Women Scientist Schemes, and Occupational Health Hazards of Women. She is a recipient of INSA Medal for Young Scientists (1982), PB Sen Memorial Oration by Physiological Society of India (1999), Kshanika Award by Indian Council of Medical Research (2002), Sir Sri Ram Oration by National Academy of Medical Sciences (I) (2003) and K.N. Seneviratne Memorial Oration by Sri Lankan Physiological Society (2004).

== Work ==
Dr. Anand has been working in the field of physiology with her main efforts focused on energy on the control mechanism of cardio - respiratory system and recently she is engaged in combining physiology with clinical sciences to identify the origin of neural pathways or mechanisms underlying exertional breathlessness with exercise with an objective to alleviate the dyspneic distresses of patients with cardio respiratory disease.

== Awards ==
- INSA Young Scientist Award in 1982
- J. L. Nehru Birth Centenary Oration, 2004.
- Award from Indian Council of Medical Research
