= John Oliver (Ontario politician) =

Canadian provincial politician

Member of Parliament for Oakville
- In office October 19, 2015 – September 11, 2019
- Preceded by: Terence Young
- Succeeded by: Anita Anand

Personal details
- Born: 1956 (age 69–70) Guelph, Ontario, Canada
- Party: Liberal
- Education: McMaster University; University of Toronto
- Profession: Healthcare executive
- Website: johnoliver.mp

John Oliver (born 1956) is a politician in Ontario, Canada. He is a former Liberal member of the House of Commons of Canada who was elected in 2015 in the riding of Oakville. He served one term and chose not to run for re-election.

== Early life ==
Oliver was born in Guelph, Ontario, the son of Ellice and Peter Oliver, who was a local veterinarian. He is the second oldest of 3 siblings.

He attended McMaster University earning a Bachelor of Commerce degree. In 1982 he became a Chartered Accountant. He was later named a Fellow of the Institute of Chartered Accountants of Ontario (FCPA). Oliver also attended the University of Toronto, where he earned a master's degree in health administration, the Canadian College of Health Executives where he became a Certified Health Executive and in 2003 became a Member of the American College of Healthcare Executives.

== Career ==
Oliver served in a variety of jobs in the public and private sectors, including as an Assistant Deputy Minister in the Ontario Ministry of Health and Long-Term Care. He has served as the president and chief executive officer of numerous hospitals including Georgetown and District Memorial Hospital and Oakville-Trafalgar Memorial Hospital. He presided over the amalgamation of the Milton District Hospital, Oakville-Trafalgar Memorial Hospital and later the Georgetown and District Memorial to form Halton Healthcare Services. The amalgamation of Milton District Hospital and Oakville-Trafalgar Memorial Hospital has been noted by the Ministry of Health to be one of the most successful and least problematic amalgamations in Ontario.

Oliver served as president and CEO of Halton Healthcare for more than 16 years before retiring. While at Halton Healthcare he supervised the development of the $2.7 billion New Oakville Hospital. The new hospital opened on time and on budget in 2015, and is one of Canada's single largest infrastructure projects to date.

Oliver has served as the chair of the Cardiac Care Network of Ontario, Chair of the Halton-Peel District Health Council, and as Chair of the Canadian Institutes of Health Research (CIHR) Partnerships for Health System Improvement Committee.

== Politics ==
On October 2, 2014, Oliver won the Liberal nomination for the Oakville riding in the next general election, defeating local lawyer Jennifer Malabar. In the 2015 Canadian federal election, he defeated Conservative Party incumbent Terence Young by 4,480 votes. On July 26, 2018, Oliver was nominated to be the Liberal candidate for the 2019 general election, becoming one of the first Liberal candidates to be nominated.

Oliver has been quoted as saying his main reason for entering politics was seeing the deterioration of Canada's healthcare and research systems by the previous government. Oliver is a fierce proponent of National Pharmacare. One of his first actions after taking office was to initiate a study into a National Pharmacare program for Canada at the Standing Committee on Health. The report titled Pharmacare Now: Prescription Medicine Coverage for All Canadians was released in April 2018. It calls for the creation of a national prescription drug formulary, and for the Canada Health Act be amended to include drugs prescribed outside of a hospital to be an insured service. Oliver is quoted as saying after the report's release "For me it’s simple, no Canadian should be denied access to necessary prescription medicines because they can’t afford it".

He served on the Standing Committee on Health and the Standing Joint Committee for the Scrutiny of Regulations.

As of 2016, Oliver was the chair of the Liberal Automotive Caucus.

== Electoral record ==
2015 Canadian federal election
Party	Candidate	Votes	%	±%	Expenditures
Liberal	John Oliver	31,967	49.40	+18.67	$101,542.36
Conservative	Terence Young	27,487	42.48	-11.75	$164,576.53
New Democratic	Che Marville	3,830	5.92	-8.02	$12,633.98
Green	David Doel	1,420	2.19	-1.49	$1,662.12
Total valid votes/Expense limit		64,704	100.00		$227,734.51
Total rejected ballots		–	–	–	
Turnout		–	–	–	
Eligible voters		87,670			
Source: Elections Canada

== Personal life ==
John lives in Oakville with his wife Joanna. He has three children Rachel, Alex and William.
