= Oakville, CA =

Oakville, CA may refer to:

- Oakville, Ontario, Canada, a town
  - Oakville (federal electoral district)
  - Oakville (provincial electoral district)
  - Oakville—Milton, a defunct federal electoral district
- Oakville, Manitoba, Canada, an unincorporated community
- Oakville, California, United States, a census-designated place
