= Halton (federal electoral district) =

Former federal electoral district in Ontario, Canada

Coordinates: 43.484°N 79.887°W

Ontario electoral district
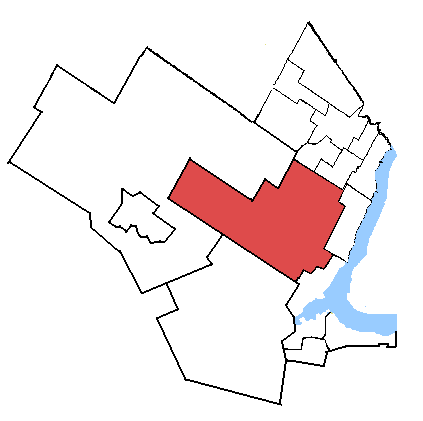
- Halton, 2003–2015, in relation to other Ontario electoral districts

Defunct federal electoral district
- Legislature: House of Commons
- District created: 1996
- District abolished: 2013
- First contested: 1997
- Last contested: 2011
- District webpage: profile, map

Demographics
- Population (2011): 203,437
- Electors (2011): 115,255
- Area (km²): 537.47
- Census division: Halton
- Census subdivision(s): Burlington, Milton, Oakville

Halton was a federal electoral district in Ontario, Canada, represented in the House of Commons of Canada from 1867 to 1988 before being abolished in an electoral district redistribution, and again from 1997 to 2015, when it was again abolished in another electoral district redistribution. When it was last contested in 2011, its population was 203,437, of whom 115,255 were eligible electors.

== Electoral district ==
=== 1867–1966 ===
Halton riding was created by the British North America Act, 1867, and defined as Halton County.

=== 1966–1976 ===
In 1966, the riding was redefined to consist of the Towns of Milton and Oakville and the Township of Esquesing in the County of Halton, and the Township of Erin in the County of Wellington.

=== 1976–1987 ===
In 1976, it was redefined to consist of the Towns of Milton and Oakville, and the southern part of the Town of Halton Hills.

The electoral district was abolished in 1987 when it was redistributed between Halton—Peel and Oakville—Milton ridings.

=== 1996–2015 ===
In 1996, the riding was re-created to include the Town of Milton and the northern parts of the Town of Oakville and the City of Burlington, defined as:

- the Town of Milton,
- the part of the Town of Oakville lying northwest of a line drawn from northeast to southwest along Dundas Street West, southeaster along Eighth Line, and southwest along Upper Middle Road, and
- the part of the City of Burlington lying northwest of a line drawn from northeast to southwest along the Queen Elizabeth Way, northwest along Walkers Line, southwest along Upper Middle Road, northwest along Guelph Line, and southwest along Dundas Street.

In 2015, the riding of Halton was abolished and redistributed between Milton, Oakville North—Burlington, Burlington, Mississauga—Streetsville and Mississauga—Erin Mills.

== Members of Parliament ==
This riding elected the following members of Parliament:

Parliament	Years	Member	Party
Halton
1st	1867–1872	John White	Liberal
2nd	1872–1874	John White	Liberal
3rd	1874–1875	Daniel Black Chisholm	Liberal–Conservative
3rd	1875–1878	William McCraney	Liberal
4th	1878–1882	William McDougall	Liberal–Conservative
5th	1882–1887	William McCraney	Liberal
6th	1887–1888	John Waldie	Liberal
6th	1888–1888	David Henderson	Conservative
6th	1888–1891	John Waldie	Liberal
7th	1891–1896	David Henderson	Conservative
8th	1896–1900	David Henderson	Conservative
9th	1900–1904	David Henderson	Conservative
10th	1904–1908	David Henderson	Conservative
11th	1908–1911	David Henderson	Conservative
12th	1911–1917	David Henderson	Conservative
13th	1917–1921	Robert King Anderson	Conservative
14th	1921–1925	Robert King Anderson	Conservative
15th	1925–1926	Robert King Anderson	Conservative
16th	1926–1930	Robert King Anderson	Conservative
17th	1930–1935	Robert King Anderson	Conservative
18th	1935–1940	Hughes Cleaver	Liberal–Progressive
19th	1940–1945	Hughes Cleaver	Liberal
20th	1945–1949	Hughes Cleaver	Liberal
21st	1949–1953	Hughes Cleaver	Liberal
22nd	1953–1957	Sybil Bennett	Progressive Conservative
23rd	1957–1958	Charles Alexander Best	Progressive Conservative
24th	1958–1962	Charles Alexander Best	Progressive Conservative
25th	1962–1963	Harry Harley	Liberal
26th	1963–1965	Harry Harley	Liberal
27th	1965–1968	Harry Harley	Liberal
28th	1968–1972	Rutherford Lester Whiting	Liberal
29th	1972–1974	Terry O'Connor	Progressive Conservative
30th	1974–1979	Frank Philbrook	Liberal
31st	1979–1980	Otto Jelinek	Progressive Conservative
32nd	1980–1984	Otto Jelinek	Progressive Conservative
33rd	1984–1988	Otto Jelinek	Progressive Conservative
Riding dissolved into Halton—Peel and Oakville—Milton
Riding re-created from Halton—Peel, Oakville—Milton, Oakville and Burlington
36th	1997–2000	Julian Reed	Liberal
37th	2000–2004	Julian Reed	Liberal
38th	2004–2006	Gary Carr	Liberal
39th	2006–2006	Garth Turner	Conservative
39th	2006–2007	Garth Turner	Independent
39th	2007–2008	Garth Turner	Liberal
40th	2008–2011	Lisa Raitt	Conservative
41st	2011–2015	Lisa Raitt	Conservative
Riding dissolved into Milton, Oakville North—Burlington, Burlington, Mississauga—Streetsville and Mississauga—Erin Mills

== Election results ==
=== 1997–2015 ===
Graph of election results in Halton (1997–2015). Omitted are minor parties consistently registering less than 2% of the vote, as well as those who campaigned intermittently. View source data.

2011 Canadian federal election
Party	Candidate	Votes	%	±%	Expenditures
Conservative	Lisa Raitt	44,206	54.4	+6.9	
Liberal	Connie Laurin-Bowie	20,903	25.8	-10.4	
New Democratic	Patricia Heroux	12,960	16.0	+7.2	
Green	Judi Remigio	2,778	3.4	-3.6	
Christian Heritage	Tony Rodrigues	249	0.3	-0.2	
Total valid votes		81,096	100.0		
Total rejected ballots		290	0.4	+0.1	
Turnout		81,394	62.4	+1.9	
Eligible voters		130,026	–	–	

2008 Canadian federal election
Party	Candidate	Votes	%	±%	Expenditures
Conservative	Lisa Raitt	32,986	47.5	+3.5	$106,182
Liberal	Garth Turner	25,136	36.2	-5.2	$51,972
New Democratic	Robert Wagner	6,118	8.8	0.0	$3,421
Green	Amy Collard	4,872	7.0	+1.4	$4,509
Christian Heritage	Tony Rodrigues	337	0.5	–	$2,108
Total valid votes/Expense limit		69,449	100.0	$107,026	
Total rejected ballots		225	0.3		
Turnout		69,674	60.5		

2006 Canadian federal election
Party	Candidate	Votes	%	±%
Conservative	Garth Turner	30,578	44.2	+5.3
Liberal	Gary Carr	28,498	41.4	-6.9
New Democratic	Anwar Naqvi	6,110	8.8	+0.6
Green	Kyle Grice	4,026	5.6	+0.5
Total valid votes		69,212	100.0	
Conservative gain from Liberal		Swing		-6.1

2004 Canadian federal election
Party	Candidate	Votes	%	±%
Liberal	Gary Carr	27,362	48.3	+1.1
Conservative	Dean Martin	21,704	38.8	-8.3
New Democratic	Anwar Naqvi	4,642	8.2	+3.8
Green	Frank Marchetti	2,889	5.1	+3.4
Total valid votes		56,597	100.0	

Note: Conservative vote is compared to the total of the Canadian Alliance vote and Progressive Conservative vote in 2000 election.

2000 Canadian federal election
Party	Candidate	Votes	%	±%
Liberal	Julian Reed	28,168	47.3	0.0
Alliance	Tim Dobson	15,656	26.3	+4.1
Progressive Conservative	Tom Kilmer	12,114	20.3	-4.7
New Democratic	Brenda Dolling	2,633	4.4	0.0
Green	Tom Adams	1,018	1.7	+0.6
Total valid votes		59,589	100.0	

Note: Canadian Alliance vote is compared to the Reform vote in 1997 election.

1997 Canadian federal election
Party	Candidate	Votes	%
Liberal	Julian Reed	26,017	47.2
Progressive Conservative	Ralph Scholtens	13,778	25.0
Reform	Richard Malboeuf	12,221	22.2
New Democratic	Jay Jackson	2,452	4.5
Green	Bill Champ	600	1.1
Total valid votes		55,068	100.0

=== 1867–1988 ===
Graph of election results in Halton (1867–1984). Omitted are minor parties consistently registering less than 2% of the vote, as well as those who campaigned intermittently. View source data.

1984 Canadian federal election
Party	Candidate	Votes	%	±%
Progressive Conservative	Otto Jelinek	38,076	60.6	+13.8
Liberal	Oriena R.M. Currie	14,125	22.5	-14.2
New Democratic	Kevin Flynn	9,164	14.6	-1.4
Green	Chris Kowalchuk	1,494	2.4	
Total valid votes		62,859	100.0	

1980 Canadian federal election
Party	Candidate	Votes	%	±%
Progressive Conservative	Otto Jelinek	24,752	46.8	-6.5
Liberal	Bill Perras	19,380	36.6	+4.9
New Democratic	Doug Black	8,455	16.0	+1.5
Libertarian	Karen Selick	170	0.3	+0.1
Independent	Robert J. Ritchie	142	0.3	0.0
Marxist–Leninist	Charles Shrybman	18	0.0	0.0
Total valid votes		52,917	100.0	

1979 Canadian federal election
Party	Candidate	Votes	%	±%
Progressive Conservative	Otto Jelinek	28,850	53.3	+11.7
Liberal	Frank A. Philbrook	17,169	31.7	-13.5
New Democratic	Doug Black	7,838	14.5	+1.2
Libertarian	Karen Selick	144	0.3	
Independent	Robert J. Ritchie	130	0.2	
Marxist–Leninist	Charles Shrybman	23	0.0	
Total valid votes		54,154	100.0	

1974 Canadian federal election
Party	Candidate	Votes	%	±%
Liberal	Frank Philbrook	23,520	45.2	+5.8
Progressive Conservative	Terry O'Connor	21,609	41.5	-2.2
New Democratic	Archibald Brown	6,887	13.2	-3.6
Total valid votes		52,016	100.0	

1972 Canadian federal election
Party	Candidate	Votes	%	±%
Progressive Conservative	Terry O'Connor	22,640	43.7	+9.7
Liberal	Rud L. Whiting	20,419	39.4	-8.7
New Democratic	Carolyn Holstein	8,725	16.8	-1.0
Total valid votes		51,784	100.0	

1968 Canadian federal election
Party	Candidate	Votes	%	±%
Liberal	Rud L. Whiting	17,837	48.1	+0.3
Progressive Conservative	Peter McWilliams	12,614	34.0	+2.9
New Democratic	Murray Kernighan	6,606	17.8	-2.6
Total valid votes		37,057	100.0	

1965 Canadian federal election
Party	Candidate	Votes	%	±%
Liberal	Harry C. Harley	25,213	47.8	-4.2
Progressive Conservative	Allan M. Masson	16,412	31.1	-1.4
New Democratic	Murray S. Kernighan	10,751	20.4	+6.5
Independent Conservative	Henry Timmins	373	0.7	-0.3
Total valid votes		52,749	100.0	

1963 Canadian federal election
Party	Candidate	Votes	%	±%
Liberal	Harry C. Harley	25,482	52.0	+11.2
Progressive Conservative	Sandy Best	15,949	32.5	-8.0
New Democratic	Ellis Fullerton	6,790	13.8	-3.7
Independent Conservative	Henry Timmins	481	1.0	
Social Credit	Irv Wilson	330	0.7	-0.5
Total valid votes		49,032	100.0	

1962 Canadian federal election
Party	Candidate	Votes	%	±%
Liberal	Harry C. Harley	18,556	40.7	+11.8
Progressive Conservative	Sandy Best	18,458	40.5	-20.5
New Democratic	Carl Rouleau	8,001	17.6	+7.5
Social Credit	Irving R. Wilson	547	1.2	
Total valid votes		45,562	100.0	

Note: NDP vote is compared to CCF vote in 1958 election.

1958 Canadian federal election
Party	Candidate	Votes	%	±%
Progressive Conservative	Charles Alexander Best	21,056	61.0	+2.2
Liberal	Ken Dick	9,978	28.9	-1.3
Co-operative Commonwealth	Jack Henry	3,481	10.1	-1.0
Total valid votes		34,515	100.0	

1957 Canadian federal election
Party	Candidate	Votes	%	±%
Progressive Conservative	Charles Alexander Best	17,795	58.8	+10.3
Liberal	Kenneth Y. Dick	9,145	30.2	-12.5
Co-operative Commonwealth	Jack Henry	3,344	11.0	+2.2
Total valid votes		30,284	100.0	

1953 Canadian federal election
Party	Candidate	Votes	%	±%
Progressive Conservative	Sybil Bennett	9,914	48.4	+6.9
Liberal	Murray Hunter McPhail	8,732	42.7	-6.4
Co-operative Commonwealth	Stan Allen	1,819	8.9	-0.5
Total valid votes		20,465	100.0	

1949 Canadian federal election
Party	Candidate	Votes	%	±%
Liberal	Hughes Cleaver	9,546	49.0	+2.8
Progressive Conservative	M. Sybil Bennett	8,099	41.6	-1.0
Co-operative Commonwealth	William Albert Shane	1,829	9.4	-1.8
Total valid votes		19,474	100.0	

1945 Canadian federal election
Party	Candidate	Votes	%	±%
Liberal	Hughes Cleaver	7,344	46.3	-9.5
Progressive Conservative	Allan Stanley Nicholson	6,763	42.6	-1.7
Co-operative Commonwealth	Carlyle C. Browne	1,770	11.1	
Total valid votes		15,877	100.0	

Note: Progressive Conservative vote is compared to "National Government" vote in 1940 election.

1940 Canadian federal election
Party	Candidate	Votes	%	±%
Liberal	Hughes Cleaver	7,788	55.7	+8.9
National Government	George C. Atkins	6,184	44.3	+5.3
Total valid votes		13,972	100.0	

Note: "National Government" vote is compared to Conservative vote in 1935 election.

1935 Canadian federal election
Party	Candidate	Votes	%	±%
Liberal	Hughes Cleaver	6,177	46.8	
Conservative	George Currie	5,146	39.0	-15.6
Reconstruction	Melville Marks Robinson	1,876	14.2	
Total valid votes		13,199	100.0	

1930 Canadian federal election
Party	Candidate	Votes	%	±%
Conservative	Robert King Anderson	6,976	54.6	-4.5
Progressive	James Waldbrook	5,806	45.4	
Total valid votes		12,782	100.0	

1926 Canadian federal election
Party	Candidate	Votes	%	±%
Conservative	Robert King Anderson	6,222	59.1	+3.6
Liberal	William James Laird Hampshire	4,308	40.9	-3.6
Total valid votes		10,530	100.0	

1925 Canadian federal election
Party	Candidate	Votes	%	±%
Conservative	Robert King Anderson	6,775	55.5	+12.2
Liberal	Duncan Campbell	5,424	44.5	+14.4
Total valid votes		12,199	100.0	

1921 Canadian federal election
Party	Candidate	Votes	%	±%
Conservative	Robert King Anderson	5,264	43.3	-26.9
Liberal	William Franklin Fisher	3,649	30.0	+0.3
Progressive	John Featherstone Ford	3,238	26.6	
Total valid votes		12,151	100.0	

Note: Conservative vote is compared to Government vote in 1917 election, and Liberal vote is compared to Opposition vote.

1917 Canadian federal election
Party	Candidate	Votes	%	±%
Government (Unionist)	Robert King Anderson	4,802	70.3	+15.9
Opposition (Laurier Liberals)	Walter Dymond Gregory	2,032	29.7	-15.9
Total valid votes		6,834	100.0	

Note: Government vote is compared to Conservative vote in 1911 election, and Opposition vote is compared to Liberal vote.

1911 Canadian federal election
Party	Candidate	Votes	%	±%
Conservative	David Henderson	2,618	54.3	+2.1
Liberal	Walter Harland Smith	2,199	45.7	-2.1
Total valid votes		4,817	100.0	

1908 Canadian federal election
Party	Candidate	Votes	%	±%
Conservative	David Henderson	2,417	52.3	+0.7
Liberal	William Spencer Harrison	2,205	47.7	
Total valid votes		4,622	100.0	

1904 Canadian federal election
Party	Candidate	Votes	%	±%
Conservative	David Henderson	2,288	51.6	0.0
Unknown	John S. Deacon	2,148	48.4	
Total valid votes		4,436	100.0	

1900 Canadian federal election
Party	Candidate	Votes	%	±%
Conservative	David Henderson	2,379	51.6	+0.7
Liberal	S.F. McKinnon	2,233	48.4	-0.7
Total valid votes		4,612	100.0	

1896 Canadian federal election
Party	Candidate	Votes	%	±%
Conservative	David Henderson	2,460	50.9	-0.2
Liberal	John Waldie	2,376	49.1	+0.2
Total valid votes		4,836	100.0	

Note: indicates change in popular vote from to 1891 general election.

By-election on 28 January 1892 On the election having been declared 16 November 1891
Party	Candidate	Votes
Conservative	David Henderson	acclaimed

1891 Canadian federal election
Party	Candidate	Votes	%	±%
Conservative	David Henderson	2,441	51.1	+1.4
Liberal	John Waldie	2,337	48.9	-1.4
Total valid votes		4,778	100.0	

Canadian federal by-election, 22 August 1888
Party	Candidate	Votes	%	±%
On Mr. Henderson being unseated for corrupt practices by agents
Liberal	John Waldie	2,042	50.3	
Conservative	David Henderson	2,018	49.7	-1.4
Total valid votes		4,060	100.0	

Canadian federal by-election, 7 February 1888
Party	Candidate	Votes	%	±%
On Mr. Waldie being unseated, 19 January 1888, for bribery by agents
Conservative	David Henderson	2,183	51.1	+1.2
Unknown	McLeod	2,086	48.9	
Total valid votes		4,269	100.0	

1887 Canadian federal election
Party	Candidate	Votes	%	±%
Liberal	John Waldie	2,222	50.1	-1.1
Conservative	David Henderson	2,213	49.9	
Total valid votes		4,435	100.0	

1882 Canadian federal election
Party	Candidate	Votes	%	±%
Liberal	William McCraney	1,822	51.2	
Unknown	Geo. C. McKindsey	1,739	48.8	
Total valid votes		3,561	100.0	

1878 Canadian federal election
Party	Candidate	Votes	%	±%
Liberal–Conservative	William McDougall	1,708	50.3	+2.3
Liberal	William McCraney	1,690	49.7	-2.3
Total valid votes		3,398	100.0	

On Mr. Chisholm being unseated, on petition, 8 December 1874:

By-election on 25 January 1875
Party	Candidate	Votes	%	±%
Liberal	William McCraney	1,704	52.1	+2.5
Liberal–Conservative	Daniel Black Chisholm	1,569	47.9	-2.5
Total valid votes		3,273	100.0	

1874 Canadian federal election
Party	Candidate	Votes	%	±%
Liberal–Conservative	Daniel Black Chisholm	1,464	50.4	
Liberal	J. White	1,441	49.6	-2.9
Total valid votes		2,905	100.0	

1872 Canadian federal election
Party	Candidate	Votes	%	±%
Liberal	John White	1,414	52.5	+0.1
Unknown	G.C. McKindsey	1,278	47.5	
Total valid votes		2,692	100.0	

1867 Canadian federal election
Party	Candidate	Votes	%
Liberal	John White	1,422	52.5
Conservative	George King Chisholm	1,289	47.5
Total valid votes		2,711	100.0

== See also ==
- List of Canadian electoral districts
- Historical federal electoral districts of Canada
