= Frank Philbrook =

Canadian politician

Frank Arthur Philbrook

Member of Parliament for Halton
- In office July 1974 – March 1979

Personal details
- Born: Frank Arthur Philbrook; 9 November 1931 Toronto, Ontario
- Died: 30 October 2017 (aged 85) Oakville, Ontario
- Party: Liberal
- Spouse: Mary Kathleen Hitchcox
- Profession: physician

Frank Arthur Philbrook (9 November 1931 – 30 October 2017) was a Liberal party member of the House of Commons of Canada. He graduated from the University of Toronto as MD in 1958, and was a member of the College of Family Physicians of Canada. He retired from medical practice in 1993.

Philbrook was born in Toronto, Ontario. Before entering politics, he spent two years at a mission hospital in Kashmir and then four years as Medical Officer on a World Bank project in Pakistan. Upon returning to Canada, he became director of clinical research at Ortho-Pharmaceuticals Canada Ltd, before returning to private practice in 1973.

He was first elected at the Halton riding in the 1974 general election and served in the 30th Canadian Parliament, but was defeated in the 1979 federal election by Otto Jelinek of the Progressive Conservative party.

== Electoral record ==
Halton

1974 Canadian federal election
Party	Candidate	Votes	%	±%
Liberal	Frank Philbrook	23,520	45.2	+5.8
Progressive Conservative	Terry O'Connor	21,609	41.5	-2.2
New Democratic	Archibald Brown	6,887	13.2	-3.6
Total valid votes		52,016	100.0	

1979 Canadian federal election
Party	Candidate	Votes	%	±%
Progressive Conservative	Otto Jelinek	28,850	53.3	+11.7
Liberal	Frank Philbrook	17,169	31.7	-13.5
New Democratic	Doug Black	7,838	14.5	+1.2
Libertarian	Karen Selick	144	0.3	
Independent	Robert J. Ritchie	130	0.2	
Marxist–Leninist	Charles Shrybman	23	0.0	
Total valid votes		54,154	100.0	
