= Hughes Cleaver =

Canadian politician

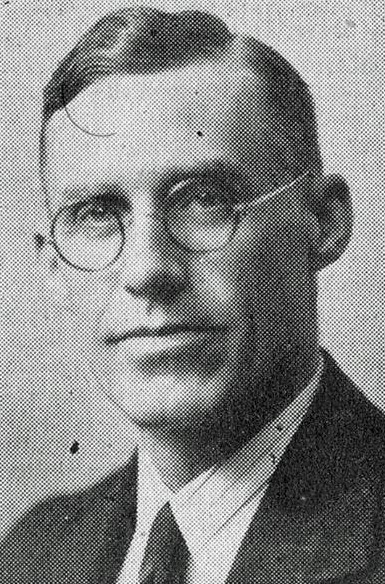
- Hughes Cleaver on his reelection in 1945

Member of Parliament for Halton
- In office October 1935 – June 1953
- Preceded by: Robert King Anderson
- Succeeded by: Sybil Bennett

Personal details
- Born: 12 September 1892 Burlington, Ontario, Canada
- Died: 31 October 1980 (aged 88) Burlington, Ontario, Canada
- Party: Liberal
- Spouses: Ariel Annie Shapland (m. 1916; died 1975): Beatrice
- Profession: lawyer

Ellis Hughes Cleaver Jr. (12 September 1892 – 31 October 1980) was a Liberal party member of the House of Commons of Canada. He was born in Burlington, Ontario and became a lawyer by career.

== Biography ==
He was called to the bar in 1914 and later elected as Reeve of Burlington in 1918, but resigned in order to serve with the 1st Canadian Tank Battalion towards the end of World War I. He was elected as Burlington's Mayor in 1920.

He was first elected to Parliament at the Halton riding in the 1935 general election, running as a Liberal-Progressive candidate but later allying with the Liberals. He was afterwards re-elected under the Liberal banner for successive terms in 1940, 1945 and 1949. He specialized in committee work during his time there, and served as Chairman of the Banking and Commerce Committee for ten years, of the War Expenditures Committee for two years, as well as of the Government-owned Railway and TCA Committee.

Cleaver left the House of Commons after completing his fourth term in office, the 21st Canadian Parliament, and did not seek another term in the 1953 election upon being reinstated as a barrister by the Law Society of Upper Canada. (Note: He had been disbarred for misuse of clients' funds, shortly after the 1929 stock market crash) In his professional work afterwards, he was a key player in the development of many of Burlington's subdivisions, and helped to establish the Joseph Brant Memorial Hospital.

== Electoral record ==
1949 Canadian federal election
Party	Candidate	Votes	%	±%
Liberal	Hughes Cleaver	9,546	49.0	+2.8
Progressive Conservative	M. Sybil Bennett	8,099	41.6	-1.0
Co-operative Commonwealth	William Albert Shane	1,829	9.4	-1.8
Total valid votes		19,474	100.0	

1945 Canadian federal election
Party	Candidate	Votes	%	±%
Liberal	Hughes Cleaver	7,344	46.3	-9.5
Progressive Conservative	Allan Stanley Nicholson	6,763	42.6	-1.7
Co-operative Commonwealth	Carlyle C. Browne	1,770	11.1	n/a
Total valid votes		15,877	100.0	

Note: Progressive Conservative vote is compared to "National Government" vote in 1940 election.

1940 Canadian federal election
Party	Candidate	Votes	%	±%
Liberal	Hughes Cleaver	7,788	55.7	+8.9
National Government	George C. Atkins	6,184	44.3	+5.3
Total valid votes		13,972	100.0	

Note: "National Government" vote is compared to Conservative vote in 1935 election.

1935 Canadian federal election
Party	Candidate	Votes	%	±%
Liberal–Progressive	Hughes Cleaver	6,177	46.8	+1.4
Conservative	George Currie	5,146	39.0	-15.6
Reconstruction	Melville Marks Robinson	1,876	14.2	n/a
Total valid votes		13,199	100.0	
