= John Waldie =

Canadian politician

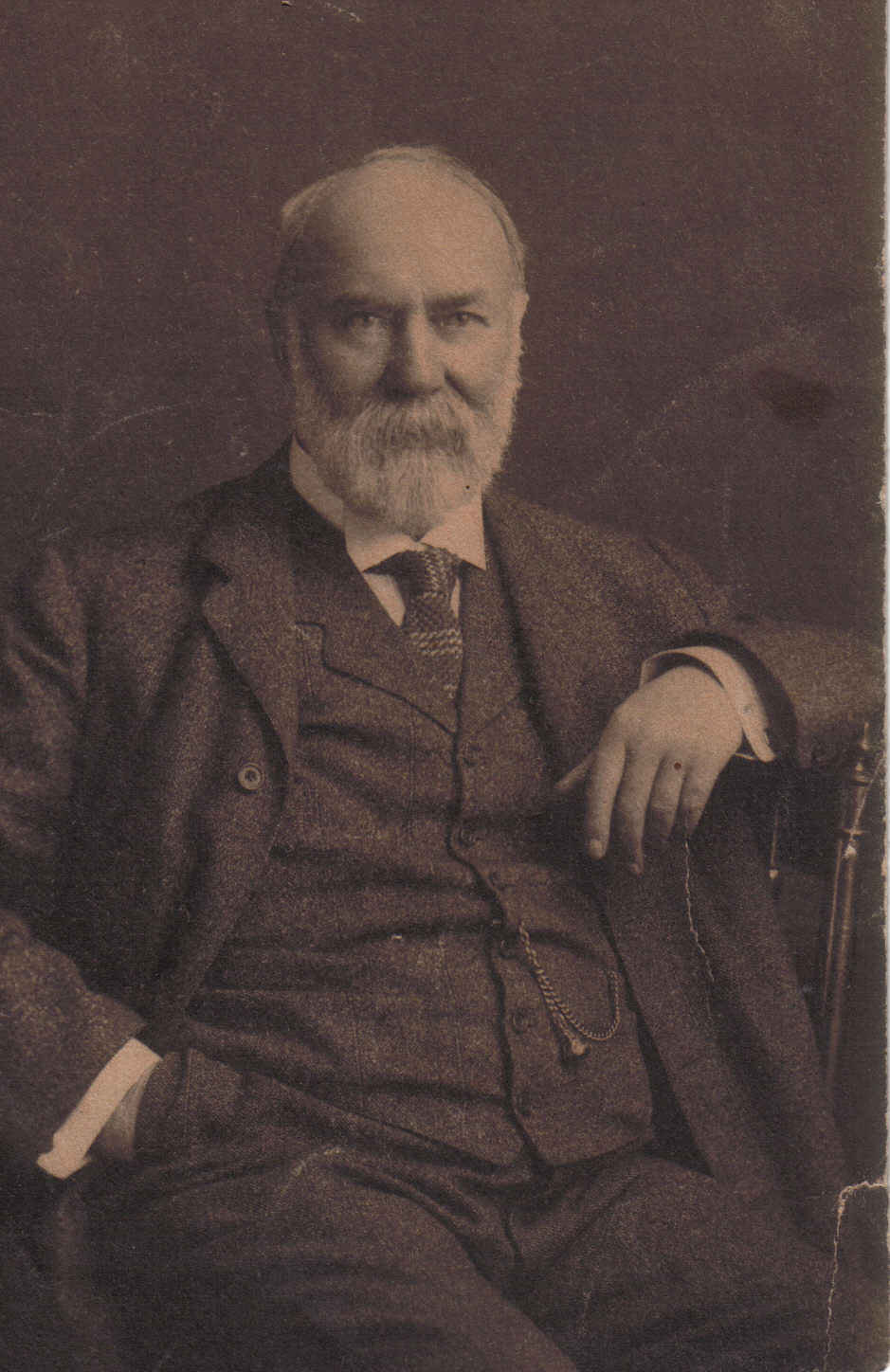
- Portrait of John Waldie (1906)

Member of Parliament for Halton
- In office 1887–1888
- Preceded by: William McCraney
- Succeeded by: David Henderson
- In office 1888–1891
- Preceded by: David Henderson
- Succeeded by: David Henderson

Personal details
- Born: 22 April 1833 Hawick, Roxburghshire, Scotland
- Died: 12 June 1907 (aged 74) Toronto, Ontario, Canada
- Resting place: Burlington, Ontario, Canada
- Party: Liberal
- Profession: lumber merchant

John Waldie (22 April 1833 – 12 June 1907) was a Canadian politician and businessman.

== Biography ==
Born in Hawick, Roxburghshire, Scotland, he moved to Canada West when still a youth. When the rest of his family moved to Huron County to establish a farm, he decided to remain in Nelson Township, becoming a prominent wheat merchant. He was Reeve of Nelson Township for two years, and was instrumental in incorporating the Village of Wellington Square in 1873. After Wellington Square was amalgamated with Port Nelson to become the Village of Burlington late that year, he became its Reeve for five years. During that time, he was also Warden of Halton County for two years.

In 1885, he sold his interest in his business to his partner, and became a lumber baron, moving to Toronto in the process. He founded the Victoria Harbour Lumber Company (consolidating three mills then operating) that year, located at Victoria Harbour, Ontario. Many of the buildings he had constructed there have since been designated as heritage properties. He would acquire further mills in his lifetime, including one in Spragge, Ontario just one month before his death.

He was also the President of two tanneries, located at Collingwood and Burk's Falls, and was a director on the boards of the Toronto Paper Company (operating in Cornwall) and the Canada Coating Mills (located in Georgetown).

Waldie was also a director of the Bank of Toronto, and had also been vice-president of the Landed Banking and Loan Company in Hamilton, Ontario, which later became part of Canada Permanent Trust.

He was elected to the House of Commons of Canada as a Member of the Liberal Party in the 1887 election to represent the riding of Halton, later being re-elected in 1888, but defeated in the elections of 1891 and 1896. In that time, he developed a close friendship with Wilfrid Laurier, which proved useful after he left office.

== Electoral record ==
1896 Canadian federal election
Party	Candidate	Votes	%	±%
Conservative	David Henderson	2,460	50.9	-0.2
Liberal	John Waldie	2,376	49.1	+0.2
Total valid votes		4,836	100.0	

1891 Canadian federal election
Party	Candidate	Votes	%	±%
Conservative	David Henderson	2,441	51.1	+1.4
Liberal	John Waldie	2,337	48.9	-1.4
Total valid votes		4,778	100.0	

Canadian federal by-election, 22 August 1888
Party	Candidate	Votes	%	±%
On Mr. Waldie being unseated, 19 January 1888, for bribery by agents, and the subsequent winner Mr. Henderson being then unseated for corrupt practices by agents
Liberal	John Waldie	2,042	50.3	
Conservative	David Henderson	2,018	49.7	-1.4
Total valid votes		4,060	100.0	

1887 Canadian federal election
Party	Candidate	Votes	%	±%
Liberal	John Waldie	2,222	50.1	-1.1
Conservative	David Henderson	2,213	49.9	
Total valid votes		4,435	100.0	
