= Harry Harley =

Canadian politician

Harry Cruickshank Harley
- Official 1966 portrait

Member of Parliament for Halton
- In office June 18, 1962 – June 24, 1968
- Preceded by: Charles Alexander Best
- Succeeded by: Rud Whiting

Personal details
- Born: June 4, 1926 Weston, Ontario
- Died: September 27, 2014 (aged 88) Oakville, Ontario
- Party: Liberal
- Spouse: Marguerite Ellen Louise Harley
- Profession: Physician

Harry Cruickshank Harley (4 June 1926 – 27 September 2014) was a Canadian politician who served as Liberal party member of the House of Commons of Canada. He was a physician by career.

== Political career ==
Harley was first elected at the Halton riding in the 1962 general election, narrowly defeating the incumbent Charles Alexander Best in a result where the armed services vote swung over to the Liberals. He was subsequently re-elected in 1963 and 1965. After completing his term in the 27th Canadian Parliament in 1968, Harley left federal politics and did not seek further re-election. His departure was said to be for personal reasons only, and not because of Pierre Elliott Trudeau winning the Liberal leadership.

=== Electoral record ===
1965 Canadian federal election
Party	Candidate	Votes	%	±%
Liberal	Harry C. Harley	25,213	47.8	-4.2
Progressive Conservative	Allan M. Masson	16,412	31.1	-1.4
New Democratic	Murray S. Kernighan	10,751	20.4	+6.5
Independent Conservative	Henry Timmins	373	0.7	-0.3
Total valid votes		52,749	100.0	

1963 Canadian federal election
Party	Candidate	Votes	%	±%
Liberal	Harry C. Harley	25,482	52.0	+11.2
Progressive Conservative	Sandy Best	15,949	32.5	-8.0
New Democratic	Ellis Fullerton	6,790	13.8	-3.7
Independent Conservative	Henry Timmins	481	1.0	
Social Credit	Irv Wilson	330	0.7	-0.5
Total valid votes		49,032	100.0	

1962 Canadian federal election
Party	Candidate	Votes	%	±%
Liberal	Harry C. Harley	18,556	40.7	+11.8
Progressive Conservative	Sandy Best	18,458	40.5	-20.5
New Democratic	Carl Rouleau	8,001	17.6	+7.5
Social Credit	Irving R. Wilson	547	1.2	
Total valid votes		45,562	100.0	
