= Oakville Trafalgar Memorial Hospital =

- Halton Healthcare
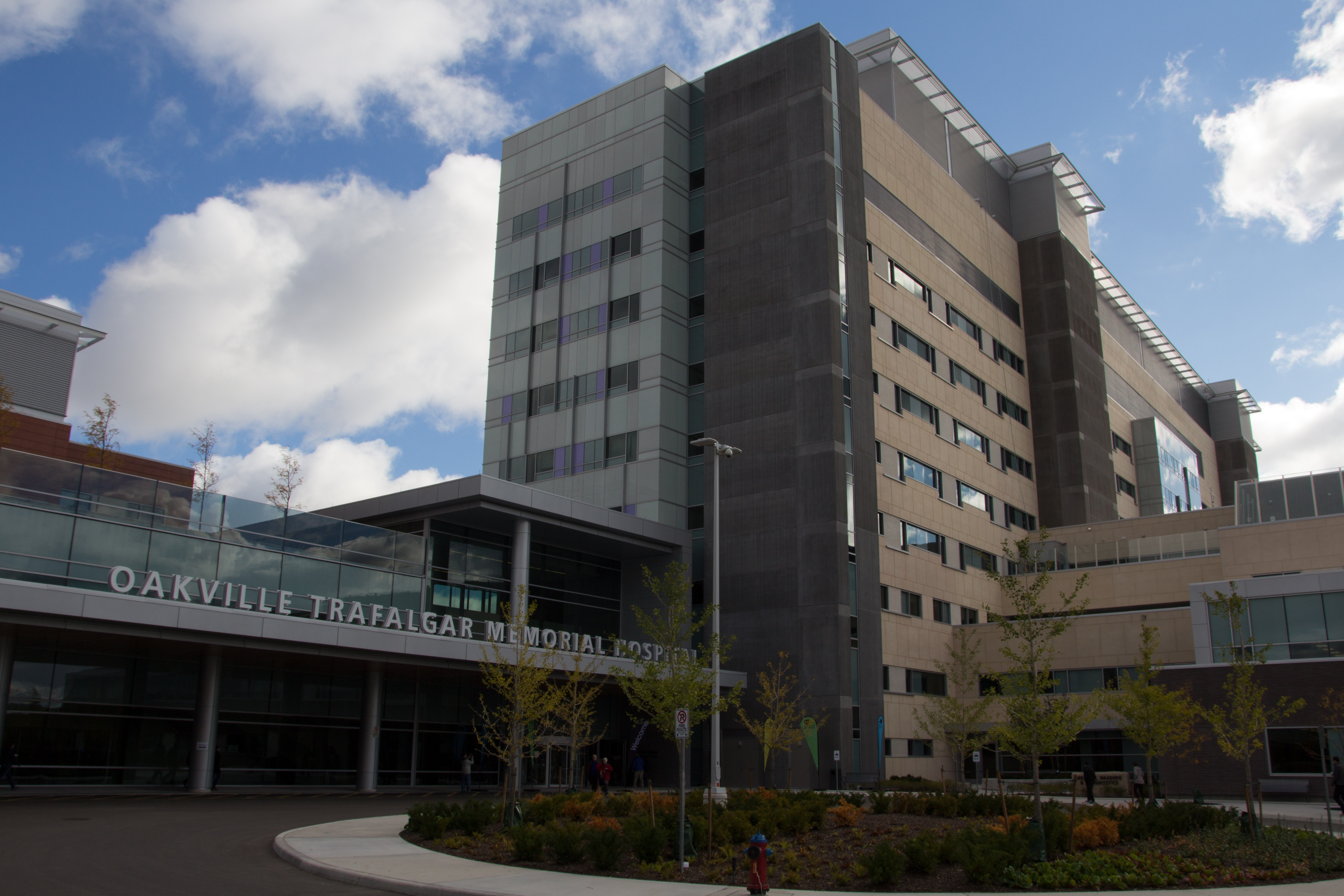

- Location in Ontario

Geography
- Location: Oakville, Halton Region, Ontario, Canada
- Coordinates: 43°27′03.5″N 079°45′49.5″W

Organization
- Care system: Public Medicare (Canada) (OHIP)
- Type: Community
- Affiliated university: Michael G. DeGroote School of Medicine, Toronto Metropolitan University School of Medicine

Services
- Emergency department: Yes
- Beds: 457

Helipads
- Helipad: TC LID: CTM9

History
- Founded: 1937, 1950 on Reynolds St., 2015 on present site

Links
- Website: www.haltonhealthcare.on.ca/locations/oakville-trafalgar-memorial-hospital
- Lists: Hospitals in Canada

The Oakville Trafalgar Memorial Hospital (or OTMH) is a full-service acute care community hospital located at 3001 Hospital Gate in Oakville, Ontario. It offers a comprehensive range of primary and secondary care services in addition to some tertiary services. It is operated by Halton Healthcare, an organization which also operates Georgetown Hospital and Milton District Hospital.

== History ==
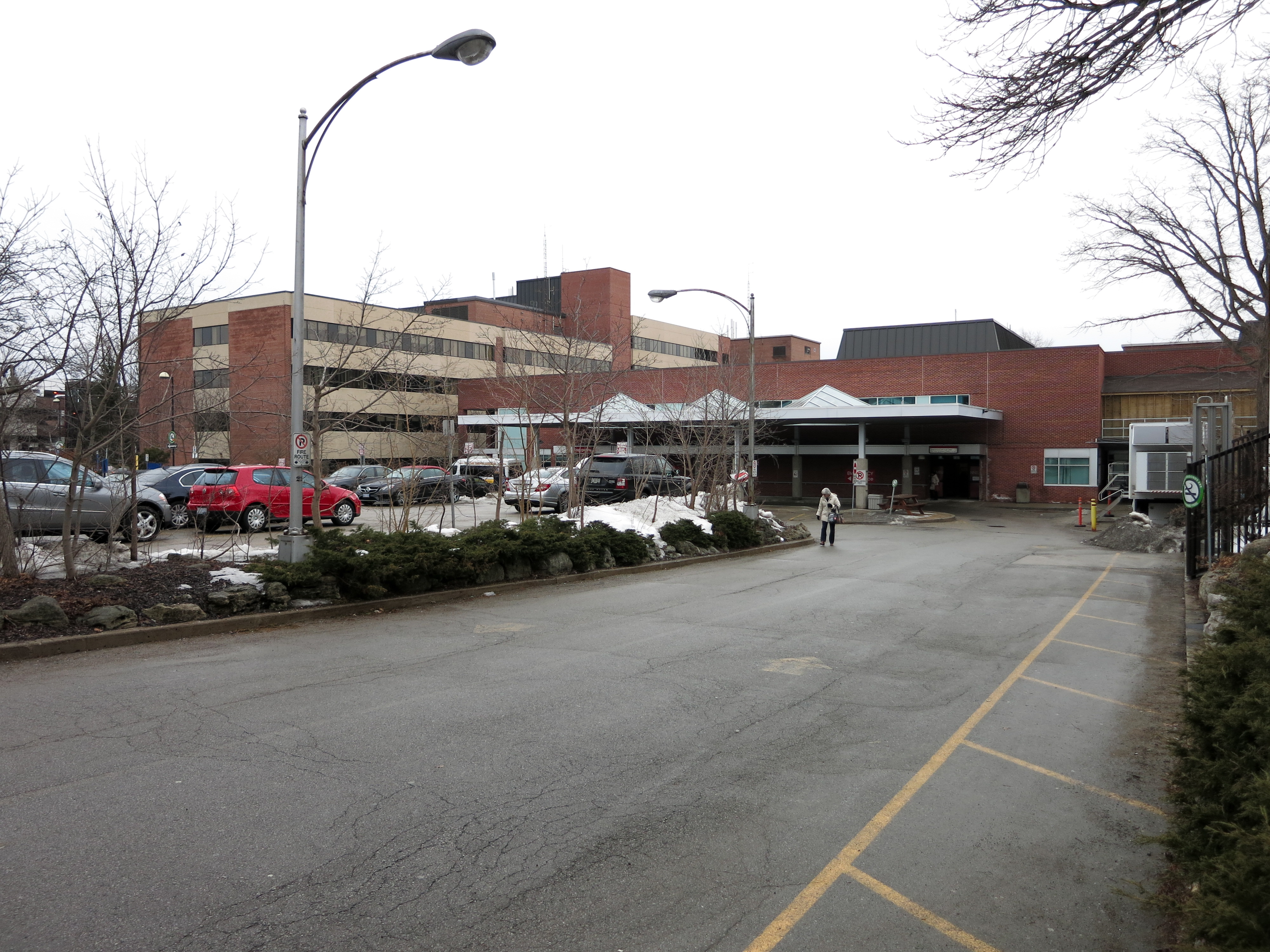
The former Oakville Trafalgar Memorial Hospital located on 327 Reynolds Street. Demolition of the site began in August 2017.

The hospital was designed by Parkin Architects and Adamson Associates and built by a joint venture of EllisDon and Carillion. On December 13, 2015 the hospital moved from 327 Reynolds Street (now Oakville Trafalgar Community Centre) to 3001 Hospital Gate near Dundas Street and Third Line.

== Patient statistics ==
OTMH has more than 15,000 inpatients each year, while over 240,000 patients visit its outpatient areas. There are 2,300 births a year. The hospital's busy 24-hour emergency department experiences more than 70,000 visits annually.

== Operations ==
The hospital is supported by the Oakville Hospital Foundation and the Oakville Hospital Volunteer Association which raises funds to purchase equipment for the hospital. The hospital is affiliated with the Michael G. DeGroote School of Medicine at McMaster University.
