= Bonnie Brown (Canadian politician) =

Canadian politician

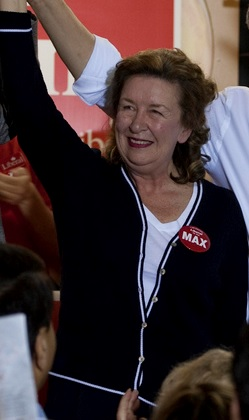

Member of Parliament for Oakville (Oakville—Milton; 1993–1997)
- In office October 25, 1993 – October 14, 2008
- Preceded by: Otto Jelinek
- Succeeded by: Terence Young

Personal details
- Born: March 2, 1941 (age 85) Toronto, Ontario, Canada
- Party: Liberal
- Spouse: Ron Coupland
- Profession: Executive director, social worker, teacher

M. A. Bonnie Brown (born March 2, 1941) is a former Canadian member of Parliament for the riding of Oakville and a member of the Liberal Party of Canada. Politically, she is considered to have been on the left wing of her party.

== Biography ==
Brown was born in Toronto, Ontario, Canada. She first sought election to the House of Commons of Canada in the 1988 federal election in the Oakville—Milton riding, where she came second. At the next federal election in 1993, Brown was elected. After Oakville—Milton was divided into two ridings, Oakville and Halton, she was re-elected in Oakville in 1997, 2000, 2004, and 2006. In the 2006 election, she won by a margin of 744 votes. She lost to Conservative Party of Canada candidate Terence Young in the October 14, 2008 federal election.

Prior to entering politics full-time, Brown was employed as a social worker and teacher. She was elected as a school trustee in 1987 and was then elected to the Oakville, Ontario Town Council, and later, the Halton Regional Council. In 1993, she replaced retiring incumbent Otto Jelinek (PC) as the member of Parliament for the riding of Oakville—Milton.

She served as chair of the Liberal Caucus Committee on Social Policy before being elected chair of the Commons all-party Standing Committee on Health. During her time on the Commons Health Committee, she recommended that patents on human genes should not be allowed.

Brown opposed the 2003 Invasion of Iraq. She also opposed Canada's involvement in a United States-led missile defence program proposal. She was also influential in Canada's ratification of the Kyoto Accord on Climate Change.

She was involved with the Advancement of Women Halton, a group that advocates for women's issues.
