= Charles Alexander Best =

Canadian politician

Charles Alexander "Sandy" Best

Member of the Canadian Parliament for Halton
- In office 1957–1962
- Preceded by: Sybil Bennett
- Succeeded by: Harry C. Harley

Personal details
- Born: July 7, 1931 Toronto, Ontario, Canada
- Died: March 25, 1978 (aged 46)
- Party: Progressive Conservative Party
- Occupation: Farmer, nurseryman, scientist

Charles Alexander Best (July 7, 1931, in Toronto, Ontario – March 25, 1978) was a Canadian politician, farmer, nurseryman and scientist. He was elected to the House of Commons of Canada in the 1957 election as a Member of the Progressive Conservative to represent the riding of Halton. He was re-elected in 1958 and defeated in the elections of 1962 and 1963. He was the son of Charles H. Best, the Canadian medical scientist, and one of the co-discoverers of insulin. He died of a heart attack causing his father to later collapse and die.
