= William McCraney =

Canadian politician

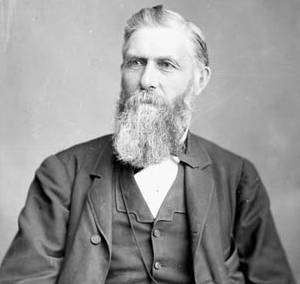
- Source: Library and Archives Canada

Mayor of Oakville
- In office 1871–1872
- Preceded by: John Barclay
- Succeeded by: George King Chisholm

Member of Parliament for Halton
- In office 1875–1878
- Preceded by: Daniel Black Chisholm
- Succeeded by: William McDougall

Member of Parliament for Halton
- In office 1882–1887
- Preceded by: William McDougall
- Succeeded by: John Waldie

Personal details
- Born: 15 December 1831 Trafalgar Township, Ontario
- Died: 21 June 1911 Bellingham, Washington
- Resting place: Oakville, Ontario
- Party: Liberal Party of Canada
- Occupation: lumber merchant

William McCraney (15 December 1831 – 21 June 1911) was a businessman and political figure in Ontario, Canada. He represented Halton in the House of Commons of Canada as a Liberal member from 1875 to 1878 and from 1882 to 1887.

== Biography ==
He was born in Trafalgar Township, Upper Canada in 1831, the son of Hiram McCraney and Louisa English. From 1852 to 1855, he was involved in lumbering and mining in California. He owned several large farms near Oakville and several sawmills in Halton County. McCraney helped build several Methodist churches and supported temperance. In 1857, he married Elizabeth Coote. In 1868, he sold his farm land and settled in Oakville. He served on the town council, serving as mayor in 1871 and 1872, and also served on the county council. McCraney was also president of the county agricultural society. He was elected as the Member of Parliament for Halton in a by-election in 1875. He was defeated by William McDougall for the Halton seat in 1878 and reelected in 1882.

His brother Daniel was a member of the Ontario assembly. His daughter Susan married Alexander Henderson.

== Electoral record ==
1882 Canadian federal election
Party	Candidate	Votes	%	±%
Liberal	William McCraney	1,822	51.2	
Unknown	Geo. C. McKindsey	1,739	48.8	
Total valid votes		3,561	100.0	

1878 Canadian federal election
Party	Candidate	Votes	%	±%
Liberal–Conservative	William McDougall	1,708	50.3	+2.3
Liberal	William McCraney	1,690	49.7	-2.3
Total valid votes		3,398	100.0	

On Daniel Black Chisholm being unseated, on petition, 8 December 1874:

By-election on 25 January 1875
Party	Candidate	Votes	%	±%
Liberal	William McCraney	1,704	52.1	+2.5
Liberal–Conservative	Daniel Black Chisholm	1,569	47.9	-2.5
Total valid votes		3,273	100.0	

== See also ==
- List of mayors of Oakville, Ontario
