= David Henderson (Canadian politician) =

Canadian politician

The Honourable David Henderson PC
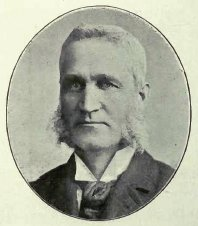

Member of the Canadian Parliament for Halton
- In office February 7, 1888 – July 17, 1888
- Preceded by: John Waldie
- Succeeded by: John Waldie
- In office 1891–1917
- Preceded by: John Waldie
- Succeeded by: Robert King Anderson

Personal details
- Born: February 18, 1841 Nelson Township, Canada West
- Died: December 7, 1922 (aged 81) Acton, Ontario, Canada
- Resting place: Acton, Ontario, Canada
- Party: Conservative
- Spouse: Alison Christie (m. 1865; died 1914)

David Henderson, PC (February 18, 1841 – December 7, 1922) was a Canadian merchant, banker and politician.

== Biography ==
Born in Nelson Township, Halton County, Canada West, Henderson was educated at the Milton Grammar School and the Normal School of Toronto, and initially worked as a teacher in Nelson, later becoming a deputy registrar for the County. In 1869, he was elected a town councillor in Milton, Ontario, but not without controversy: he was accused of having switched allegiances on election day (known as there was no secret ballot) and thus had obtained his seat under false pretences.

=== In business ===
He later settled in Acton, Ontario, and operated a general store in partnership with David Darling Christie, his brother-in-law. They also owned a quarry with related lime kilns at Kelso in Nassagaweya Township. In 1881, he established the Acton Banking Company, a private bank allied with the Bank of Hamilton, as no other bank then had a branch in the village. The bank remained in existence until 1901, and was considered to be financially sound during that time. When Acton was incorporated as a village in 1874, he served on the village council for fifteen years, including one year as Reeve in 1880.

=== As an MP ===
He was first elected to the House of Commons of Canada for the electoral district of Halton in an 1888 by-election after the sitting MP, John Waldie, was unseated for bribery by agents. His election was seen as being significant, in that he won through the support of the rural parts of the riding while voters in Milton and Georgetown swung more towards the Opposition candidate.

Henderson was then unseated for corrupt practices by agents, and was later defeated in the resulting by-election. A Conservative, he was elected in the 1891 federal election and re-elected in 1896, 1900, 1904, 1908, and 1911.

In recognition of his long service in the House of Commons, he was made a member of the King's Privy Council for Canada in February 1916.

== Electoral record ==
1911 Canadian federal election
| Party | Candidate | Votes | % | ±% |
|---|---|---|---|---|
| Conservative | David Henderson | 2,618 | 54.3 | +2.1 |
| Liberal | Walter Harland Smith | 2,199 | 45.7 | -2.1 |
| Total valid votes | | 4,817 | 100.0 | |

1908 Canadian federal election
| Party | Candidate | Votes | % | ±% |
|---|---|---|---|---|
| Conservative | David Henderson | 2,417 | 52.3 | +0.7 |
| Liberal | William Spencer Harrison | 2,205 | 47.7 | -0.7 |
| Total valid votes | | 4,622 | 100.0 | |

1904 Canadian federal election
| Party | Candidate | Votes | % | ±% |
|---|---|---|---|---|
| Conservative | David Henderson | 2,288 | 51.6 | – |
| Liberal | John S. Deacon | 2,148 | 48.4 | – |
| Total valid votes | | 4,436 | 100.0 | |

1900 Canadian federal election
| Party | Candidate | Votes | % | ±% |
|---|---|---|---|---|
| Conservative | David Henderson | 2,379 | 51.6 | +0.7 |
| Liberal | S.F. McKinnon | 2,233 | 48.4 | -0.7 |
| Total valid votes | | 4,612 | 100.0 | |

1896 Canadian federal election
| Party | Candidate | Votes | % | ±% |
|---|---|---|---|---|
| Conservative | David Henderson | 2,460 | 50.9 | -0.2 |
| Liberal | John Waldie | 2,376 | 49.1 | +0.2 |
| Total valid votes | | 4,836 | 100.0 | |

Note: indicates change in popular vote from to 1891 general election.

Canadian federal by-election, 28 January 1892 On the election having been declared void (16 November 1891)
| Party | Candidate | Votes |
|---|---|---|
| Conservative | David Henderson | acclaimed |

1891 Canadian federal election
| Party | Candidate | Votes | % | ±% |
|---|---|---|---|---|
| Conservative | David Henderson | 2,441 | 51.1 | +1.4 |
| Liberal | John Waldie | 2,337 | 48.9 | -1.4 |
| Total valid votes | | 4,778 | 100.0 | |

Canadian federal by-election, 22 August 1888 On Mr. Henderson being unseated for corrupt practices by agents
| Party | Candidate | Votes | % | ±% |
|---|---|---|---|---|
| Liberal | John Waldie | 2,042 | 50.3 | +1.4 |
| Conservative | David Henderson | 2,018 | 49.7 | -1.4 |
| Total valid votes | | 4,060 | 100.0 | |

Canadian federal by-election, 7 February 1888 On Mr. Waldie being unseated, 19 January 1888, for bribery by agents
| Party | Candidate | Votes | % | ±% |
|---|---|---|---|---|
| Conservative | David Henderson | 2,183 | 51.1 | +1.2 |
| Liberal | William McLeod | 2,086 | 48.9 | -1.2 |
| Total valid votes | | 4,269 | 100.0 | |

1887 Canadian federal election
| Party | Candidate | Votes | % | ±% |
|---|---|---|---|---|
| Liberal | John Waldie | 2,222 | 50.1 | -1.1 |
| Conservative | David Henderson | 2,213 | 49.9 | +1.1 |
| Total valid votes | | 4,435 | 100.0 | |
