= Halton Centre =

Former provincial electoral district in Ontario, Canada

Ontario electoral district

Defunct provincial electoral district
- Legislature: Legislative Assembly of Ontario
- District created: 1986
- District abolished: 1996
- First contested: 1987
- Last contested: 1995

Halton Centre was a provincial electoral district in Ontario, Canada. It existed from 1987 to 1999, when it was abolished into Wentworth-Burlington, Burlington, Halton and Oakville when ridings were redistributed to match their federal counterpart. It consisted of the central areas of Halton Region.

== Members of Provincial Parliament ==
- Barbara Sullivan (Liberal) (1987–1995)
- Terence Young (Progressive Conservative) (1995–1999)

Halton Centre
| Assembly | Years | Member | Party |
|---|---|---|---|
Riding created out of Halton-Burlington, Burlington and Oakville
| 34th | 1987–1990 | Barbara Sullivan | Liberal |
| 35th | 1990–1995 | Barbara Sullivan | Liberal |
| 36th | 1995–1999 | Terence Young | Progressive Conservative |
Riding dissolved into Wentworth-Burlington, Burlington, Halton and Oakville

== Election results ==
1995 Ontario general election
| Party | Candidate | Votes | % | ±% |
|---|---|---|---|---|
| Progressive Conservative | Terence Young | 30,621 | 61.41 | +29.53 |
| Liberal | Barbara Sullivan | 13,977 | 28.03 | –7.00 |
| New Democratic | Richard Joseph Banigan | 5,268 | 10.56 | –15.82 |
| Total valid votes | | 49,866 | 99.16 | |
| Total rejected, unmarked and declined ballots | | 422 | 0.84 | –1.21 |
| Turnout | | 50,288 | 69.06 | +5.94 |
| Eligible voters | | 72,819 | | |
| Progressive Conservative gain from Liberal | | Swing | | +18.27 |
Source: Elections Ontario

1990 Ontario general election
| Party | Candidate | Votes | % | ±% |
|---|---|---|---|---|
| Liberal | Barbara Sullivan | 13,494 | 35.03 | –18.00 |
| Progressive Conservative | Bob Taylor | 12,279 | 31.87 | –0.07 |
| New Democratic | Richard Joseph Banigan | 10,163 | 26.38 | +11.35 |
| Family Coalition | James Bruce | 1,232 | 3.20 | – |
| Freedom | Bill Frampton | 731 | 1.90 | – |
| Libertarian | Jim Stock | 624 | 1.62 | – |
| Total valid votes | | 38,523 | 97.95 | |
| Total rejected, unmarked and declined ballots | | 805 | 2.05 | +1.56 |
| Turnout | | 39,328 | 63.12 | +3.80 |
| Eligible voters | | 62,311 | | |
| Liberal hold | | Swing | | –8.96 |
Source: Elections Ontario

1987 Ontario general election
| Party | Candidate | Votes | % |
|---|---|---|---|
| Liberal | Barbara Sullivan | 15,833 | 53.03 |
| Progressive Conservative | Clifford (Barry) Quinn | 9,539 | 31.95 |
| New Democratic | Richard Joseph Banigan | 4,487 | 15.03 |
| Total valid votes | | 29,859 | 99.52 |
| Total rejected ballots | | 145 | 0.48 |
| Turnout | | 30,004 | 59.31 |
| Eligible voters | | 50,586 | |
| Liberal pickup new district. | | | |
Source: Elections Ontario

== See also ==
- List of Ontario provincial electoral districts
- Canadian provincial electoral districts
