= Milton District Hospital =

- Halton Healthcare Services
- Location in Ontario

Geography
- Location: Milton, Halton Region, Ontario, Canada
- Coordinates: 43°29′48″N 79°52′12″W

Organization
- Care system: Public Medicare (Canada) (OHIP)
- Type: Community

Services
- Emergency department: Yes
- Beds: 129

Helipads
- Helipad: TC LID: CPY2

History
- Founded: 1959

Links
- Website: www.haltonhealthcare.com
- Lists: Hospitals in Canada

Milton District Hospital (or MDH) is a community hospital built on 40 acres (16 ha) of land, located in Milton, Ontario, Canada. It is operated by Halton Healthcare, an organization which also operates Oakville Trafalgar Memorial Hospital and Georgetown Hospital.

== Overview and History ==
Prior to 1959, Milton had two pioneer "hospitals". The first being the Rasberry Nursing Home, operated by Robert and Margaret Rasberry, which opened in the early 1930s at 72 Martin Street. From 1933 to 1943 roughly 500 babies were born in that facility. This early facility was supported by Dr. C. Keith Stephenson who arrived in Milton in 1929.

The second pioneer hospital opened in 1943 when Dr. Stephenson converted his Martin Street house into a private Milton Hospital. The facility operated with 12 beds overall, and four or five bassinets for labour and delivery. This hospital functioned until December 14, 1959 when the new Milton District Hospital opened on Derry Road on November 21, 1959. Dr. Stevenson was the first chief of surgical staff at the new Derry Rd. hospital.

In February 1954, Milton's Chamber of Commerce seriously considered for the first time a push for a new hospital. Initial planning for MDH solidified when in 1956 a ten-acre site was purchased for $1,000 an acre. By 1959 the construction of MDH was complete at a cost of $830,000 on what then called 10 Sideroad, and the doors officially opened to patients. Close to 4,000 people toured the new hospital when it opened.

In its first seven years of operation from 1959 to 1966, MDH served 11,000 patients, 2,000 babies and 24,000 emergencies.

In 1972, MDH purchased 20 acres at a cost of $4,000 per acre to the east on Derry Rd. and to the south on Bronte St. in order to plan for future expansion.

In cooperation with the Ministry of Health and Long-Term Care, MDH has been very effective in attracting physicians and specialists to Milton.

The population of Milton was expected to increase to more than 100,000 by 2014. HHS submitted a business case to the Ministry of Health and Long Term for the expansion of MDH and received approval from the government to begin planning its latest expansion.

In 2006, the hospital received a $500,000 CAD donation from James W. Snow for the hospital Foundation's CT Scanner Campaign.

== Services ==
Milton District Hospital offers a wide range of primary care services. Its major areas of clinical emphasis include emergency, obstetrics, general medicine, intensive care unit, surgery, rehabilitation, complex transitional care and medical imaging.

The emergency department is open 24 hours a day, seven days a week, together with the outpatient department provides care to more than 37,000 patients annually.

The hospital is equipped with a helipad.

In 2024, four beds were dedicated for child and adolescent care, with a new pediatrics expansion of services.

== Expansions ==
In 1959, MDH opened with 53 beds. MDH's first expansion came in 1967, only a few years after initially opening its doors. Thirty beds were added in that 1967 expansion.

After significant population growth in the 1970s, a proposal for a further expansion was first proposed in 1979, and by 1980, 52 patients per day were visiting the emergency room, double the number from 10 years prior. The hospital also underwent a significant multi-year expansion that was completed in 1988, which involved two wings, and increased the total number of beds to 103. Prior to this expansion the hospital had 83 beds. A Canadian Kiowa military helicopter was also flown in 1983 to test a route for a proposed helipad addition at the hospital. To fund the expansion a $1-million fundraising goal was set, with $100,000 of that total being achieved through a "Help us, Help you" buy a break campaign.

In 2015, the Government of Ontario announced an investment of up to $501.3 million to support the construction of a new four-story patient care building at Milton District Hospital to give patients faster access to care.

Through this expansion, patients in Milton were expected to benefit from:

- A new patient care building to offer priority clinical services, including critical care, maternal newborn, diagnostic imaging, emergency, surgery and inpatient beds
- Increasing inpatient beds from 63 to 129, including more single-patient rooms for improved infection prevention and increased patient privacy
- The addition of the hospital's first Magnetic Resonance Imaging (MRI) machine
- A Special Care Nursery with capacity for eight bassinettes in the Maternal Newborn Unit.

Construction at Milton District Hospital was completed in 2017. A news report in September 2017 indicated that the facility now provided an extra 330,000 square feet of health-care space. The Emergency Department, for example, was tripled in size, with a new capacity of 45,000 patient visits per year.
