= Terence Young (politician) =

Canadian politician

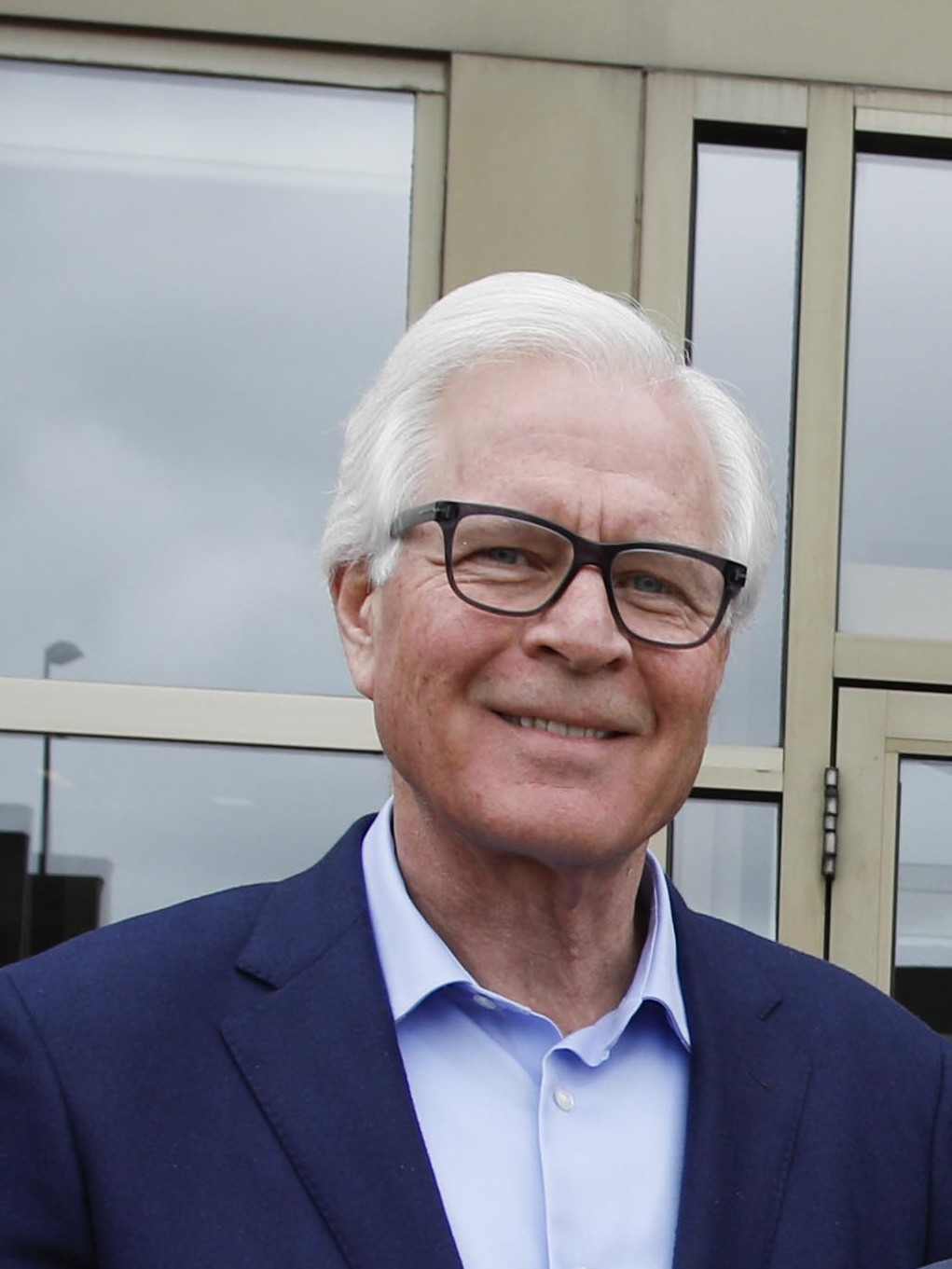

Member of Parliament for Oakville
- In office 2008 – August 4, 2015
- Preceded by: Bonnie Brown
- Succeeded by: John Oliver

Ontario MPP for Halton Centre
- In office 1995–1999
- Preceded by: Barbara Sullivan
- Succeeded by: Riding abolished

Personal details
- Born: Terence Hart Young; July 24, 1952 (age 74) Toronto, Ontario, Canada
- Party: Conservative
- Spouse: Gloria Young
- Children: 3
- Profession: Business manager

Terence Hart Young (born July 24, 1952) is a Canadian politician and prescription drug activist. He was a Conservative member of the House of Commons of Canada from 2008 to 2015 who represented the riding of Oakville. Previously, Young was a Progressive Conservative member of the Legislative Assembly of Ontario between 1995 and 1999. He is also the founder of drug safety activist group Drug Safety Canada.

== Background ==
Young was born in Toronto, Ontario. His father was an Anglican minister at St. Anne's Anglican Church in Toronto's west end. Young's mother Judith is a member of the Massey family. His great uncle Denton Massey represented the riding of Greenwood in Toronto in parliament from 1935 until 1949, and is related to Raymond Massey.

He received his B.A. in Political and Social Science from York University in 1975 and attended Osgoode Hall Law School for one year, before pursuing a business career. He worked for Ford Motor Company in sales, was a General Motors Sales Master and was licensed by the American Federation of Musicians to book Canadian musicians through Music Shoppe International. Before politics Young also worked as a manager for Bell Canada.

He lives in Ancaster, Ontario with wife Gloria whom he married in 1980. They raised three children, daughters, Madeline and Vanessa; and son, Hart.

Young served as President of the Lewis Garnsworthy Tower, a not-for-profit supportive housing residence for seniors in Toronto, and on the board of St. Hilda's Towers from 2001 to 2013. He was vice-chair of the Ontario Association of Former Parliamentarians (2001) and Founding President of Policy Alliance Inc., a government relations firm (2001).

== Drug advocacy ==
Young's fifteen-year-old daughter Vanessa died in 2000 after taking the Johnson & Johnson prescription drug cisapride (brand name in Canada: Prepulsid). Young became a consumer advocate after this incident, and has been fighting for a more stringent and protective drug-monitoring system in Canada. He founded Drug Safety Canada to advocate for safe prescription drugs, and also initiated a hundred million dollar class action lawsuit against Johnson & Johnson and Health Canada in 2000, and an individual lawsuit, later settled after a six-year court battle. This story is told in detail in Young's 2009 book Death by Prescription. He introduced a Private member's bill on April 20, 2009, to establish an independent drug agency for Canada similar to the Canadian Nuclear Safety Commission or the Transportation Safety Board of Canada, focussing solely on prescription drug safety. The bill has been reintroduced through subsequent parliamentary sessions up to the most recent (as of August 2015), the 41st Canadian Parliament, 2nd session, but has never advanced to become law. After earlier government legislation had died on the Order Paper at the dissolution of the 39th Canadian Parliament, Young conceived and sponsored Bill C-17, An Act to amend the Food and Drugs Act — Protecting Canadians from Unsafe Drugs Act (Vanessa's Law), named for his late daughter, which received Royal assent on November 6, 2014. The law gives Health Canada powers to order drug companies to provide clearly worded safety warnings to patients and doctors for all drugs in plain language, to change drug labels for drugs on the market to clearly reflect new safety information, to conduct new studies on drugs that have shown safety concerns, to take unsafe drugs off the market and the supply chain within 48 hours, and to compel health care institutions to report all serious adverse drug reactions to Health Canada. It also, amongst other powers, allows the Minister of Health to compel drug companies to make confidential business information (CBI) on their drugs available to specific entities such as the provinces and researchers, when patients are at risk of serious harm. The law also provides for fines, the level of which is at a court's discretion, for criminal negligence that harms patients.

Authors in the Canadian Medical Association Journal have noted concerns with the enforcement of drug reaction reporting the law requires, with heretofore onerous reporting methods leading to low rates of report (5%), and suggesting "Reports for adverse drug reactions must be simple and quick to complete, and support clinical decisions at the point of care". Others have suggested the law will fail as it excludes natural remedies.

== Provincial politics ==
Young was elected for the Progressive Conservative Party of Ontario to the provincial legislature in the 1995 election, defeating incumbent Liberal Barbara Sullivan by 16,644 votes in Halton Centre amid a PC Party of Ontario sweep of the region. He served as a backbench supporter of the Mike Harris government. He served as Parliamentary Assistant to the Minister of Education for three years with responsibility for Colleges and Universities, and then as Parliamentary Assistant to Finance Minister.

Young was part of a "family values caucus" in the Progressive Conservative Party, a group of right-wing members which included Jim Brown, Jack Carroll and Frank Klees. The group promoted legislation that sought to impress a certain moral view in Ontario society. Young said, "family values are things you have to discuss all the time. We didn't have any specific commitment to any family values legislation in the election campaign. But individual candidates like myself may have." In 1997 and 1998, Young twice sponsored a private members bill called the Zero Tolerance for Substance Abuse Act which would have required school principals to automatically suspend students if they were caught with cigarettes, alcohol or drugs. Both times the bill didn't make it past second reading.

Young criticized the Halton School Board for approving Joyce Carol Oates's novel, Foxfire: Confessions of a Girl Gang, for Grade Twelve English. Young admitted he had not read the book but had seen excerpts which he characterized as pornographic and obscene.

In 1996, the Harris government reduced the number of provincial ridings from 130 to 103. As a result, some MPPs from the same party were forced to compete against one another for re-nomination. Young ran for the Progressive Conservative nomination in the new constituency of Oakville, but lost to fellow MPP Gary Carr, 651 votes to 432.

Young endorsed Frank Klees's bid to become leader of the PC Party of Ontario in 2004, who lost to John Tory; Christine Elliott in 2009, who lost to Tim Hudak; and Christine Elliot again in 2015, who lost to Patrick Brown.

In 2000, he was appointed to the board of the Alcohol and Gaming Commission by Mike Harris.

== Federal politics ==
Young ran for the House of Commons of Canada as an independent candidate in the 1974 federal election, in the Toronto riding of Parkdale. He received 144 votes, finishing well behind winner Stanley Haidasz of the Liberal Party.

He was elected to the House of Commons in the 2008 federal election, defeating Liberal incumbent Bonnie Brown in Oakville. On May 2, 2011, Young was reelected in Oakville with a larger majority of 12,178 votes, defeating local Oakville councillor Liberal Max Khan. He served as a backbench supporter of the Stephen Harper government.

In December 2014, Young introduced a Private Member's Bill called An Act Respecting the Prevention of Potential Health Risks from Radiofrequency Electromagnetic Radiation. The act which was co-written by Canadians for Safe Technology would have forced manufacturers of devices emitting electronic signals to place warning labels on the packaging. The bill did not get past first reading.

As a member of the Standing Committee on Health, Young devoted much of his time in Parliament to speaking out about the dangers of marijuana and the deaths it is allegedly directly responsible for. Young contended that marijuana legalization would normalize its use among Canadian youth, who currently lead the developed world in marijuana consumption. Young's argument that legalizing marijuana would still allow minors access because minors clearly have access to tobacco and alcohol despite age restrictions, had the unintended consequence of also being an argument against the legalization of the latter two substances, as noted by pundits.

Young was acclaimed as the Conservative candidate in Oakville riding for the 2015 Canadian federal election. At an all candidates' debate hosted by the Oakville Chamber of Commerce on October 6, 2015, when asked how he and his party would create employment for young Canadians, Young changed the subject stating one of the biggest problems Canada's youth have is drugs. The move provoked a groan from the crowd. Young also alleged during the campaign that the Liberal Party would create brothels if elected.

In the 2015 federal election, he lost to Liberal candidate John Oliver by 4,480 votes.

He attempted a comeback in the 2019 federal election, but he lost to Liberal candidate Anita Anand. After the 2019 election, Young supported attempts to remove Andrew Scheer as leader of the Conservative Party. Speaking with The Globe and Mail, Young described Scheer as "a nice man," but that during the election he didn't find a way to connect affirmatively with voters. Young said that he first noticed this issue during the campaign. "Not one voter ever said to me, 'Gee, I really like your leader,'" Young said. "Many voters said various versions of the opposite." He also said that "A partial victory is still a loss" (the Conservatives had gained seats but too few to replace the Liberals as the governing party), and that he believed Peter MacKay could "connect with people" and that he was "principled." He said about Scheer that "This isn’t a Rotary club, this is our country, and no one deserves a second chance because people like them."

== Electoral record ==
2019 Canadian federal election: Oakville
Party	Candidate	Votes	%	±%	Expenditures
Liberal	Anita Anand	30,265	46.28	-3.11	$88,029.39
Conservative	Terence Young	25,561	39.08	-3.41	$98,290.90
New Democratic	Jerome Adamo	4,928	7.54	+1.62	none listed
Green	James Elwick	3,704	5.66	+3.47	$7,355.08
People's	JD Meaney	798	1.22		none listed
Christian Heritage	Sushila Pereira	145	0.22		none listed
Total valid votes/expense limit		65,401	99.26		
Total rejected ballots		487	0.74	+0.36	
Turnout		65,888	72.94	-0.51	
Eligible voters		90,334			
Liberal hold		Swing		+0.15	
Source: Elections Canada

2015 Canadian federal election
Party	Candidate	Votes	%	±%	Expenditures
Liberal	John Oliver	31,967	49.40	+18.67	$101,542.36
Conservative	Terence Young	27,487	42.48	-11.75	$164,576.53
New Democratic	Che Marville	3,830	5.92	-8.02	$12,633.98
Green	David Doel	1,420	2.19	-1.49	$1,662.12
Total valid votes/expense limit		64,704	100.00		$227,734.51
Total rejected ballots		–	–	–	
Turnout		–	–	–	
Eligible voters		87,670			
Source: Elections Canada

2011 Canadian federal election
Party	Candidate	Votes	%	±%
Conservative	Terence Young	30,068	51.65	+4.67
Liberal	Max Khan	17,890	30.73	-6.35
New Democratic	James Ede	8,117	13.94	+5.48
Green	Andrew Chlobowski	2,140	3.68	-4.78
Total valid votes/expense limit		58,215	100.00	
Total rejected ballots		196	0.34	-0.03
Turnout		58,411	69.15	–
Eligible voters		84,466	–	–

2008 Canadian federal election
Party	Candidate	Votes	%	±%	Expenditures
Conservative	Terence Young	26,011	46.98	+4.88	$73,203
Liberal	Bonnie Brown	20,528	37.08	-6.27	$68,042
Green	Blake Poland	4,681	8.46	+3.65	$8,707
New Democratic	Michelle Bilek	4,143	7.48	-2.26	$4,973
Total valid votes/expense limit		55,363	100.00	$88,184	
Total rejected ballots		201	0.36		
Turnout		–			

2006 Canadian federal election
Party	Candidate	Votes	%	±%
Liberal	Bonnie Brown	25,892	43.35	-8.66
Conservative	Terence Young	25,148	42.10	+6.75
New Democratic	Tina Agrell	5,815	9.74	+2.45
Green	Laura Domsy	2,872	4.81	-0.37
Total valid votes		59,727	100.00	

1995 Ontario general election
Party	Candidate	Votes	%
Progressive Conservative	Terence Young	30,621	61.40
Liberal	Barbara Sullivan	13,977	28.02
New Democratic	Richard Banigan	5,268	10.56
Total valid votes		49,866	100.00

1974 Canadian federal election
Party	Candidate	Votes
Liberal	Stanley Haidasz	13,134
Progressive Conservative	Lubor J. Zink	7,133
New Democratic Party	COTTER, Evelyn	4,479
Independent	Terence Young	144
Communist	MCLELLAN, Neil	132
Marxist–Leninist	MACLEAN, Gordon	95
