= Barbara Sullivan =

Canadian politician (1943–2021)

Ontario MPP
- In office 1987–1995
- Preceded by: Riding established
- Succeeded by: Terence Young
- Constituency: Halton Centre

Personal details
- Born: Barbara Ann Pickard; January 24, 1943 Calgary, Alberta, Canada
- Died: January 24, 2021 (aged 78) Hamilton, Ontario, Canada
- Party: Liberal
- Occupation: Journalist

Barbara Ann Pickard Sullivan (24 January 1943 – 24 January 2021) was a politician in Ontario, Canada. She was a Liberal member of the Legislative Assembly of Ontario from 1987 to 1995.

== Background ==
Sullivan was educated at the Carleton University School of Journalism, and worked as a journalist and later as a public affairs consultant. She lived in Hamilton, Ontario. Prior to her election to the Ontario Legislature, she was Principal Secretary to the Treasurer (Minister of Finance) in Ontario, serving both as chief of staff and lead policy advisor to the Minister. She was past director and vice-chair of Bird Studies Canada, chaired the Board of Directors of the Oakville Centre for the Performing Arts, patron of Sheridan College's Performing Arts program, and Commissioner and Acting Chair of the Commission on Election Finances in Ontario.

== Politics ==
She was elected to the Ontario legislature in the 1987 provincial election, defeating her Progressive Conservative opponent in Halton Centre by over 6,000 votes amid a landslide Liberal majority at the provincial level. Sullivan served in the government of Premier David Peterson as the government caucus chair, parliamentary assistant to the Minister of Labour from 1988 to 1989, and chair of the Select Committee on Energy in the Ontario legislature. She also represented the elected members of the governing Liberal Party on the legislature's Board of Internal Economy.

The Liberals were defeated by the New Democratic Party in the provincial election of 1990. Sullivan retained her riding by 1,215 votes over a challenger from the Progressive Conservatives, and served as her party's Environment Critic and Health Critic from 1990 to 1995.

Sullivan lost her riding to PC candidate Terence Young in the provincial election of 1995. Sullivan attempted to return to the legislature in the 2003 provincial election but lost to Progressive Conservative incumbent Ted Chudleigh in the newly redistributed riding of Halton.

== Later life ==
Sullivan was a member of the Board of Directors, and subsequently Chair of the Board, of Hamilton Health Sciences Corporation. She served as working Chair of the Health Professions Regulatory Advisory Council in Ontario, and as a Director of Oaklands Regional Centre in Oakville. Active in community matters, she was a Director of Ontario's Retirement Homes Regulatory Authority, the Bay Area Health Trust, and a member of the Quality Committee of Hamilton Health Sciences. She was a frequent speaker at universities and health systems and public affairs conferences.

She had been politically active, both on policy and organizational fronts. She managed three successful mayoralty campaigns in the City of Toronto for Art Eggleton, was Ontario campaign manager for Hon. Jean Chretien in his bid for leadership of Canada's Liberal Party, and managed Dr. Stuart Smith's successful campaign for the leadership of the Ontario Liberal Party.

She has been recognized for her work by several national and international citations and awards. Sullivan died of cancer on her 78th birthday, 24 January 2021, in Hamilton, Ontario.
