= Robert King Anderson =

Canadian politician

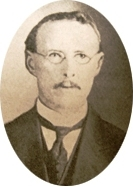
- Robert King Anderson upon taking office as MP in the House of Commons of Canada in 1918.

Member of Parliament for Halton
- In office 1917–1935
- Preceded by: David Henderson
- Succeeded by: Hughes Cleaver

Personal details
- Born: August 29, 1861 Trafalgar Township, Canada West
- Died: July 3, 1950 (aged 88) Hamilton, Ontario
- Resting place: Milton, Ontario
- Party: Unionist (1917-1922); Conservative (later)
- Spouse: Lavina Ann Cowan (m. 1894; died 1947)
- Profession: physician, teacher

Robert King Anderson (August 29, 1861 – July 3, 1950) was a Canadian politician, physician and teacher.

== Biography ==
Anderson graduated as a physician from the University of Toronto in 1888, and pursued postgraduate studies in Edinburgh, New York City and Chicago before setting up in practice. On settling in Milton, Ontario, he pursued an interest in local politics, becoming a town councillor in 1904-1907 and Mayor in 1907–1909, as well as being Chairman of the Milton Hydro-Electric Commission for eight years. From 1906, he served in the Canadian Militia with the 20th Halton Rifles as its major and paymaster.

He was elected to the House of Commons of Canada representing the riding of Halton in 1917 and re-elected in 1921, 1925, 1926 and 1930.

== Electoral record ==
1930 Canadian federal election
Party	Candidate	Votes	%	±%
Conservative	Robert King Anderson	6,976	54.6	-4.5
Liberal–Progressive	James Waldbrook	5,806	45.4	
Total valid votes		12,782	100.0	

1926 Canadian federal election
Party	Candidate	Votes	%	±%
Conservative	Robert King Anderson	6,222	59.1	+3.6
Liberal	William James Laird Hampshire	4,308	40.9	-3.6
Total valid votes		10,530	100.0	

1925 Canadian federal election
Party	Candidate	Votes	%	±%
Conservative	Robert King Anderson	6,775	55.5	+12.2
Liberal	Duncan Campbell	5,424	44.5	+14.4
Total valid votes		12,199	100.0	

1921 Canadian federal election
Party	Candidate	Votes	%	±%
Conservative	Robert King Anderson	5,264	43.3	-26.9
Liberal	William Franklin Fisher	3,649	30.0	+0.3
Progressive	John Featherstone Ford	3,238	26.6	
Total valid votes		12,151	100.0	

Note: Conservative vote is compared to Government vote in 1917 election, and Liberal vote is compared to Opposition vote.

1917 Canadian federal election
Party	Candidate	Votes	%	±%
Government (Unionist)	Robert King Anderson	4,802	70.3	+15.9
Opposition (Laurier Liberals)	Walter Dymond Gregory	2,032	29.7	-15.9
Total valid votes		6,834	100.0	

Note: Government vote is compared to Conservative vote in 1911 election, and Opposition vote is compared to Liberal vote.
