= Rutherford Lester Whiting =

Canadian politician

Rud Whiting

MP
- In office 1968–1972
- Preceded by: Harry Harley
- Succeeded by: Terry O'Connor
- Constituency: Halton

Personal details
- Born: Rutherford Lester Whiting; July 30, 1930 Montreal, Quebec
- Died: February 13, 2014 (aged 83) Ridgeway, Ontario
- Party: Liberal
- Profession: Sales

Rutherford "Rud" Lester Whiting (July 30, 1930 – February 13, 2014) was a Canadian politician, who was the Liberal Member of Parliament for the riding of Halton from 1968 until 1972.

== Political career ==
When Harry Harley, Halton's incumbent MP, decided not to stand for reelection in the 1968 general election, Whiting (who was already on the riding party executive) decided to contest the party nomination, and eventually won by two votes over Oakville Mayor MacLean Anderson on the fourth ballot. He became MP in the subsequent election.

He was defeated by Terry O'Connor of the Progressive Conservative Party of Canada in the 1972 general election.

In 1985, Whiting attempted to reenter politics at the local level by campaigning for a Regional Councillor seat for Ward 4 in Halton Hills, but was defeated by the incumbent Marilyn Sarjeantson.

Whiting was later a marketing manager for a land developer, and subsequently became a real estate agent.

=== Electoral record ===
1972 Canadian federal election
Party	Candidate	Votes	%	±%
Progressive Conservative	Terry O'Connor	22,640	43.7	+9.7
Liberal	Rud L. Whiting	20,419	39.4	-8.7
New Democratic	Carolyn Holstein	8,725	16.8	-1.0
Total valid votes		51,784	100.0	

1968 Canadian federal election
Party	Candidate	Votes	%	±%
Liberal	Rud L. Whiting	17,837	48.1	+0.3
Progressive Conservative	Peter McWilliams	12,614	34.0	+2.9
New Democratic	Murray Kernighan	6,606	17.8	-2.6
Total valid votes		37,057	100.0	
