= Sybil Bennett =

Canadian politician

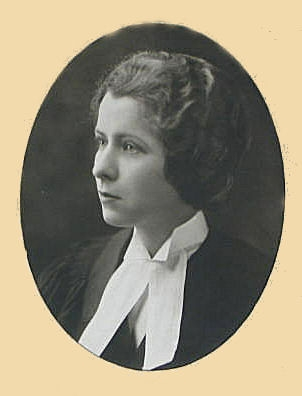
- Sybil Bennett upon being called to the Ontario bar (1930)

Member of Parliament for Halton
- In office 1953–1956
- Preceded by: Hughes Cleaver
- Succeeded by: Charles Alexander Best

Personal details
- Born: February 7, 1904 St. George, Ontario, Canada
- Died: November 12, 1956 (aged 52) Churchville, Ontario, Canada funeral in Milton, Ontario
- Resting place: Georgetown, Ontario
- Party: Progressive Conservative
- Occupation: Lawyer

Marion Sybil Bennett (February 7, 1904 – November 12, 1956) was a Canadian politician. She represented the electoral district of Halton in the House of Commons of Canada from 1953 until her death.

== Biography ==
Bennett's parents were from one of the oldest families to have settled in Halton County, being of United Empire Loyalist origin from Massachusetts. She was also a second cousin to R.B. Bennett. She obtained degrees from the University of Toronto and Osgoode Hall, where she took active part in political debates.

Bennett was called to the bar in 1930, and, in 1945, became the fourth woman in the British Commonwealth to be named as a King's Counsel. She was one of the first women in Canada to enter private practice in law, setting up in partnership in Brampton and later opening a law office in Georgetown. She had the reputation of being a gifted orator.

A member of the Progressive Conservative Party, Bennett first ran for election in the 1949 election, but was defeated by Liberal incumbent Hughes Cleaver. Cleaver did not run again in 1953, and Bennett won the riding over new Liberal candidate Murray McPhail. On becoming an MP, she sat in the same seat in the chamber that her cousin once had.

Along with Margaret Aitken, Ellen Fairclough and Ann Shipley, she was one of four women elected to the House of Commons in 1953, only the second election in Canadian history in which more than one woman was elected to Parliament.

Bennett died at her home on November 12, 1956, being the first female MP in Canada ever to do so in office. She died just four days after her law partner LeRoy Dale, with whom she had been in partnership since 1936.

No by-election was held following her death; she was succeeded by Charles Alexander Best in the 1957 election.

== Electoral record ==
1953 Canadian federal election
Party	Candidate	Votes	%	±%
Progressive Conservative	Sybil Bennett	9,914	48.4	+6.9
Liberal	Murray Hunter McPhail	8,732	42.7	-6.4
Co-operative Commonwealth	Stan Allen	1,819	8.9	-0.5
Total valid votes		20,465	100.0	
