= Oakville—Milton =

Former federal electoral district in Ontario, Canada

Ontario electoral district

Defunct federal electoral district
- Legislature: House of Commons
- District created: 1987
- District abolished: 1996
- First contested: 1988
- Last contested: 1993

Oakville—Milton was a federal electoral district represented in the House of Commons of Canada from 1988 to 1997. It was located in the province of Ontario. This riding was created in 1987 from Halton riding.

Oakville—Milton consisted of the Town of Oakville, and the part of the Town of Milton lying northeast of Tremaine Road and southeast of the Macdonald-Cartier Freeway.

The electoral district was abolished in 1996 when it was re-distributed between Halton and Oakville ridings.

== Members of Parliament ==
This riding has elected the following members of Parliament:

Parliament	Years	Member	Party
Riding created from Halton
34th	1988–1993	Otto Jelinek	Progressive Conservative
35th	1993–1997	Bonnie Brown	Liberal
Riding dissolved into Halton and Oakville

== Election results ==
1988 Canadian federal election
Party	Candidate	Votes
Progressive Conservative	Otto Jelinek	35,033
Liberal	Bonnie Brown	22,793
New Democratic	Richard J. Banigan	5,614
Christian Heritage	Paul Callaway	1,087
Libertarian	Jim Stock	346

1993 Canadian federal election: Oakville—Milton
Party	Candidate	Votes	%	±%
Liberal	Bonnie Brown	34,273		
Progressive Conservative	Ann Mulvale	19,153		
Reform	Richard Malboeuf	17,251		
New Democratic Party	Willie Lambert	1,756		
Natural Law	Harry Bright	543		
Independent	Ken Campbell	432		

== See also ==
- List of Canadian electoral districts
- Historical federal electoral districts of Canada
