= Oakville (federal electoral district) =

Defunct federal electoral district in Ontario, Canada

Coordinates: 43.459°N 79.678°W

Ontario electoral district
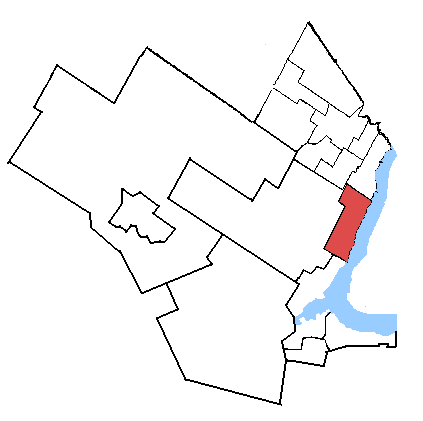
- Oakville in relation to the surrounding area ridings

Defunct federal electoral district
- Legislature: House of Commons
- District created: 1996
- First contested: 1997
- Last contested: 2021
- District webpage: profile, map

Demographics
- Population (2016): 120,923
- Electors (2015): 87,670
- Area (km²): 83
- Census division: Halton
- Census subdivision: Oakville

Oakville was a federal electoral district in Ontario, Canada, that was represented in the House of Commons of Canada from 1997 to 2025.

After the 2022 Canadian federal electoral redistribution, the riding was abolished and divided into Oakville East and Oakville West for the 2025 Canadian federal election.

== History ==
It was created in 1996 from parts of Halton and Oakville—Milton ridings.

It consisted initially of the part of the Town of Oakville lying southeast of the Queen Elizabeth Way and Upper Middle Road.

In 2003, it was redefined to consist of the part of the Town of Oakville lying southeast of a line drawn from the northeastern town limit southwest along Dundas Street East, southeast along Eighth Line and southwest along Upper Middle Road to the southwestern town limit. This riding was unchanged after the 2012 electoral redistribution.

The current boundaries include the neighbourhoods of Lakeshore Woods, Bronte, Hopedale, Coronation Park, Kerr Village, Old Oakville, Eastlake, Glen Abbey, College Park, Iroquois Ridge, Clearview, and Joshua Creek.

== Demographics ==
According to the 2021 Canadian census

Ethnic groups: 63.7% White, 10.4% Chinese, 9.8% South Asian, 3.1% Arab, 2.9% Black, 2.1% Filipino, 1.5% Latin American, 1.2% Korean, 1.2% Indigenous, 1.1% West Asian

Languages: 62.6% English, 6.7% Mandarin, 2.2% Arabic, 1.8% Spanish, 1.6% Portuguese, 1.5% Italian, 1.5% French, 1.4% Urdu, 1.3% Polish, 1.0% Tagalog, 1.0% Punjabi

Religions: 55.2% Christian (29.4% Catholic, 4.8% Anglican, 4.2% United Church, 3.5% Christian Orthodox, 1.5% Presbyterian, 11.8% other), 7.3% Muslim, 3.0% Hindu, 1.5% Sikh, 1.1% Buddhist, 30.6% none

Median income: $46,000 (2020)

Average income: $86,600 (2020)

== Members of Parliament ==
This riding has elected the following members of Parliament:

Parliament	Years	Member	Party
Oakville; Riding created from Halton and Oakville—Milton
36th	1997–2000	Bonnie Brown	Liberal
37th	2000–2004	Bonnie Brown	Liberal
38th	2004–2006	Bonnie Brown	Liberal
39th	2006–2008	Bonnie Brown	Liberal
40th	2008–2011	Terence Young	Conservative
41st	2011–2015	Terence Young	Conservative
42nd	2015–2019	John Oliver	Liberal
43rd	2019–2021	Anita Anand	Liberal
44th	2021–2025	Anita Anand	Liberal
Riding dissolved into Oakville West and Oakville East

== Election results ==
View source data.
Graph of election results in Oakville (parties that never received 2% of the vote are omitted)

2021 Canadian federal election
Party	Candidate	Votes	%	±%	Expenditures
Liberal	Anita Anand	28,137	46.1	-0.2	$108,754.31
Conservative	Kerry Colborne	24,430	40.0	+0.9	$89,145.46
New Democratic	Jerome Adamo	5,373	8.8	+1.3	$5,170.83
People's	J.D. Meaney	1,970	3.2	+2.0	$4,679.30
Green	Oriana Knox	1,090	1.8	-3.9	$3,863.91
Total valid votes/expense limit		61,000	99.5	–	$118,184.72
Total rejected ballots		330	0.5		
Turnout		61,330	68.3		
Eligible voters		89,757			
Liberal hold		Swing		-0.6	
Source: Elections Canada

2019 Canadian federal election
Party	Candidate	Votes	%	±%	Expenditures
Liberal	Anita Anand	30,265	46.28	-3.11	$88,029.39
Conservative	Terence Young	25,561	39.08	-3.41	$98,290.90
New Democratic	Jerome Adamo	4,928	7.54	+1.62	none listed
Green	James Elwick	3,704	5.66	+3.47	$7,355.08
People's	JD Meaney	798	1.22		none listed
Christian Heritage	Sushila Pereira	145	0.22		none listed
Total valid votes/expense limit		65,401	99.26		
Total rejected ballots		487	0.74	+0.36	
Turnout		65,888	72.94	-0.51	
Eligible voters		90,334			
Liberal hold		Swing		+0.15	
Source: Elections Canada

2015 Canadian federal election
Party	Candidate	Votes	%	±%	Expenditures
Liberal	John Oliver	31,956	49.39	+18.66	$101,542.36
Conservative	Terence Young	27,497	42.50	-9.15	$164,576.53
New Democratic	Che Marville	3,830	5.92	-8.02	$12,633.98
Green	David Doel	1,420	2.19	-1.48	$1,662.12
Total valid votes/expense limit		64,703	99.62		$227,734.51
Total rejected ballots		245	0.38	–	
Turnout		64,948	73.45	–	
Eligible voters		88,425			
Source: Elections Canada
Liberal gain from Conservative		Swing		+13.91	

2011 Canadian federal election
Party	Candidate	Votes	%	±%	Expenditures
Conservative	Terence Young	30,068	51.65	+4.67	
Liberal	Max Khan	17,890	30.73	-6.35	
New Democratic	James Ede	8,117	13.94	+5.48	
Green	Andrew Chlobowski	2,140	3.68	-4.78	
Total valid votes/expense limit		58,215	100.00		
Total rejected ballots		196	0.34	-0.03	
Turnout		58,411	69.15	–	
Eligible voters		84,466	–	–	

2008 Canadian federal election
Party	Candidate	Votes	%	±%	Expenditures
Conservative	Terence Young	26,011	46.98	+4.88	$73,203
Liberal	Bonnie Brown	20,528	37.08	-6.27	$68,042
Green	Blake Poland	4,681	8.46	+3.65	$8,707
New Democratic	Michelle Bilek	4,143	7.48	-2.26	$4,973
Total valid votes/expense limit		55,363	100.00	$88,184	
Total rejected ballots		201	0.36		
Turnout		–			

2006 Canadian federal election
Party	Candidate	Votes	%	±%
Liberal	Bonnie Brown	25,892	43.35	-8.66
Conservative	Terence Young	25,148	42.10	+6.75
New Democratic	Tina Agrell	5,815	9.74	+2.45
Green	Laura Domsy	2,872	4.81	-0.37
Total valid votes		59,727	100.00	

2004 Canadian federal election
Party	Candidate	Votes	%	±%
Liberal	Bonnie Brown	28,729	52.01	+4.26
Conservative	Rick Byers	19,524	35.35	-12.49
New Democratic	Alison Myrden	4,027	7.29	+4.53
Green	Tania Orton	2,861	5.18	+3.53
Canadian Action	Zeshan Shahbaz	95	0.17	
Total valid votes		55,236	100.00	

Note: Conservative vote is compared to the total of the Canadian Alliance vote and Progressive Conservative vote in 2000 election.

2000 Canadian federal election
Party	Candidate	Votes	%	±%
Liberal	Bonnie Brown	23,073	47.75	+0.06
Alliance	Dan Ferrone	13,524	27.99	+10.36
Progressive Conservative	Rick Byers	9,594	19.85	-10.28
New Democratic	Willie Lambert	1,336	2.76	-1.80
Green	David Debelle	795	1.65	
Total valid votes		48,322	100.00	

Note: Canadian Alliance vote is compared to the Reform vote in 1997 election.

1997 Canadian federal election
Party	Candidate	Votes	%
Liberal	Bonnie Brown	24,487	47.68
Progressive Conservative	Stephen Sparling	15,473	30.13
Reform	Wayne Gray	9,050	17.62
New Democratic	Willie Lambert	2,343	4.56
Total valid votes		51,353	100.00

== See also ==
- List of Canadian electoral districts
- Historical federal electoral districts of Canada
