= Halton Healthcare =

Canadian healthcare organization

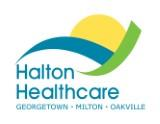
Halton Healthcare logo

Halton Healthcare (Halton Healthcare Services Corporation) is a regional healthcare organization located in the Greater Toronto Area. It is composed of three community hospitals and multiple community care sites in Ontario, Canada. It serves the communities of Milton, Oakville, and Halton Hills.

In 2023, Melissa Farrell was appointed as President and CEO of Halton Healthcare.

Halton Healthcare is the first regional hospital to offer renal (kidney) cryoablation, a minimally invasive procedure that targets kidney tumors with precision while minimizing recovery time.

== Member Hospitals ==
Halton Healthcare's three community hospitals are:

- Oakville Trafalgar Memorial Hospital - Originally opened in 1950. Relocated in 2015
- Milton District Hospital - Opened in 1959, expanded in the 1980s and significantly expanded in 2017
- Georgetown Hospital - Opened in 1961
