= Otto Jelinek =

Canadian figure skater and politician (1940–2026)

The Honourable Otto Jelinek PC
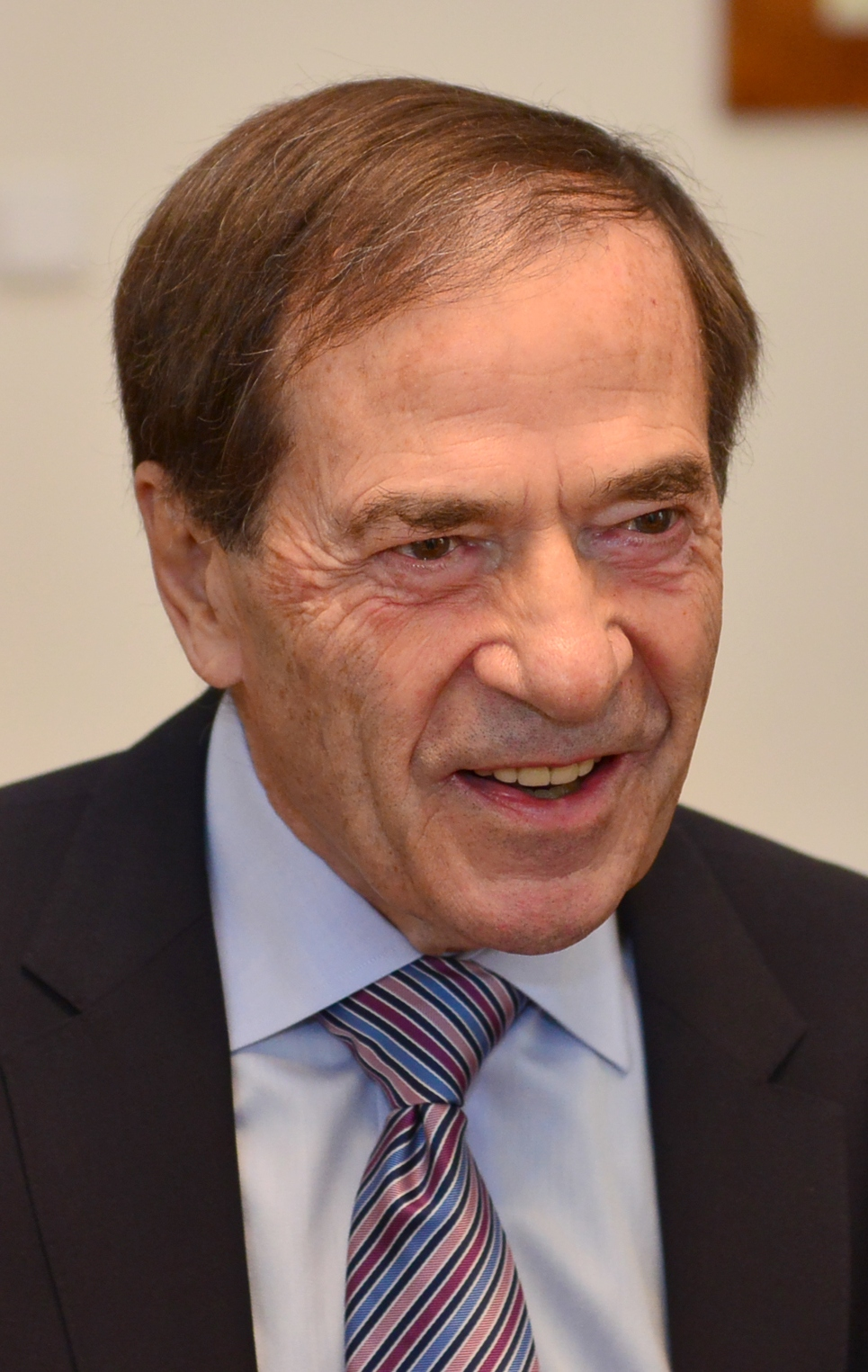
- Jelinek in 2014

Minister of National Revenue
- In office January 30, 1989 – June 24, 1993
- Prime Minister: Brian Mulroney
- Preceded by: Elmer MacKay
- Succeeded by: Garth Turner

Member of Parliament for Oakville—Milton (Halton; 1979–1988) (High Park—Humber Valley; 1972–1979)
- In office October 30, 1972 – October 25, 1993
- Preceded by: Riding established
- Succeeded by: Bonnie Brown

Personal details
- Born: Otakar Jelínek; May 20, 1940 Prague, Protectorate of Bohemia and Moravia
- Died: September 5, 2026 (aged 86) Mississauga, Ontario, Canada
- Party: Progressive Conservative
- Figure skating career
- Skating club: Oakville Skating Club
- Retired: 1962
Medal record
Figure skating – Pairs
Representing Canada
World Championships
Gold medal – first place	1962 Prague	Pairs
Silver medal – second place	1960 Vancouver	Pairs
Bronze medal – third place	1958 Paris	Pairs
Bronze medal – third place	1957 Colorado Springs	Pairs
North American Championships
Gold medal – first place	1961 Philadelphia	Pairs
Silver medal – second place	1957 Rochester	Pairs

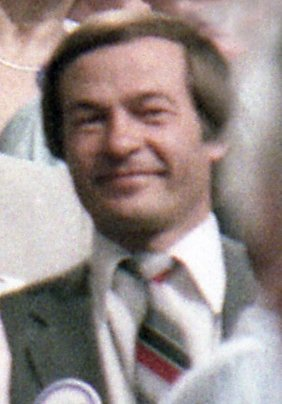
Jelinek at the 1983 Progressive Conservative leadership convention

Otto John Jelinek PC (Czech: Otakar Jelínek; May 20, 1940 – September 5, 2026) was a Czech-Canadian businessman, figure skater and politician. His family fled to Switzerland, then to Canada from Czechoslovakia in 1948, following the Communist coup d'état when communists nationalized his father's cork and aluminium caps factory. Jelinek was appointed ambassador of Canada to the Czech Republic in August 2013.

== Figure skating career ==
International
Event	1955	1956	1957	1958	1959	1960	1961	1962
Winter Olympic Games						4th		
World Championships			3rd	3rd	4th	2nd		1st
North American Championships			2nd				1st	
National
Canadian Championships	1st J.	2nd	2nd	2nd		2nd	1st	1st

- J = Junior level

Jelinek competed as a pair skater with his sister, Maria. They are the 1962 World Champions, the 1961 North American national champions, and 1961-1962 Canadian national champions. They represented Canada at the 1960 Winter Olympics, where they placed 4th.

After they won the World Championships in 1962, the Jelineks retired from competition, and toured professionally with Ice Capades. In late 1963, Jelinek became engaged to Darlene Streich, an American ice dancer who went on to win the U.S. Championships in that discipline in 1964.

The Jelineks were inducted into Canada's Sports Hall of Fame in 1962 and into the Skate Canada Hall of Fame in 1994.

== Political career ==
After retiring from professional skating, Jelinek started a business, Canadian Skate Industries, to manufacture figure and hockey skates for the mass market. He also had considerable investments in real estate.

After a time in business, Otto Jelinek entered politics and was elected in the 1972 election to the House of Commons as the Progressive Conservative Member of Parliament (MP) for High Park-Humber Valley in Metropolitan Toronto.

He was re-elected in 1974.

In 1979, he switched to the riding of Halton, where he ran and won in the 1979 federal election.

When the Tories formed the government after the 1984 election, Prime Minister Brian Mulroney appointed Jelinek to the Cabinet as Minister of State for Fitness and Amateur Sport, and the Minister responsible for Multiculturalism.

In 1988, he was named Minister of Supply and Services, and later, Minister of National Revenue.

Jelinek was returned to the Parliament in the 1988 federal election in Oakville—Milton.

He left politics after Mulroney retired and did not run in the 1993 election.

In 2013, he was appointed ambassador of Canada to the Czech Republic.

== Business career ==
In 1994, he moved to the Czech Republic, and became chairman of the Board of Directors of Deloitte & Touche Central Europe, and chairman and managing partner of the firm in the Czech Republic, a position he held until 2006. In 2007, Jelinek assumed the role of chairman of Colliers International, CEE Region. Jelinek was also a chairman of the society Olympiad for Czech Republic, which led the activities of Prague to become the host city of the 2020 Summer Olympics.

In 2011, Jelinek became a Managing Partner with Passport Energy, a Canadian oil and gas company, with responsibility for corporate and financial affairs in Europe.

== Death ==
Jelinek died on September 5, 2026, at the age of 86. He had been affected by Parkinson's disease for almost 20 years and was hospitalized at the Trillium Health Centre in Mississauga at the time of his death.
