= Melville Marks Robinson =

Canadian journalist and sports executive

Robinson at the 1930 British Empire Games

Melville Marks Robinson (April 8, 1888 – June 6, 1974) was a Canadian journalist and sports executive, also known as M. M. Robinson and Bobby Robinson. He was the sports editor of The Hamilton Spectator, and founded the British Empire Games, now known as the Commonwealth Games.

== Career ==
Born in Peterborough, Ontario, Canada, Bobby Robinson left school at 13 to work as an office boy at the Toronto News where he later was assistant sports editor. In 1910 he became sports editor for The Hamilton Spectator. He attended the 1928 Summer Olympics in Amsterdam as manager of the Canadian track and field team, to which he had recruited British Guiana runner Phil Edwards, whose "country" (actually a colony) had no Olympic team; like other countries' teams, this was Canada's first-ever co-ed track and field team.

The Amsterdam Olympics provided Robinson with a venue for the contacts he would need to sell the idea of holding British Empire Games in the "spirit of friendly competition". The first British Empire Games were therefore held in Hamilton, Ontario, Canada in 1930, with Edwards competing for British Guiana.

Robinson, who lived near Hamilton on a farm in Burlington, Ontario (from 1920-1957), was later appointed to the board of Burlington High School, serving from 1940 to 1963, including as its president from 1950 to 1963. In 1959 the City of Burlington formed its own Board of Education and Robinson became its first chairman. Upon his retirement, a new school, M. M. Robinson High School, was named in his honour.

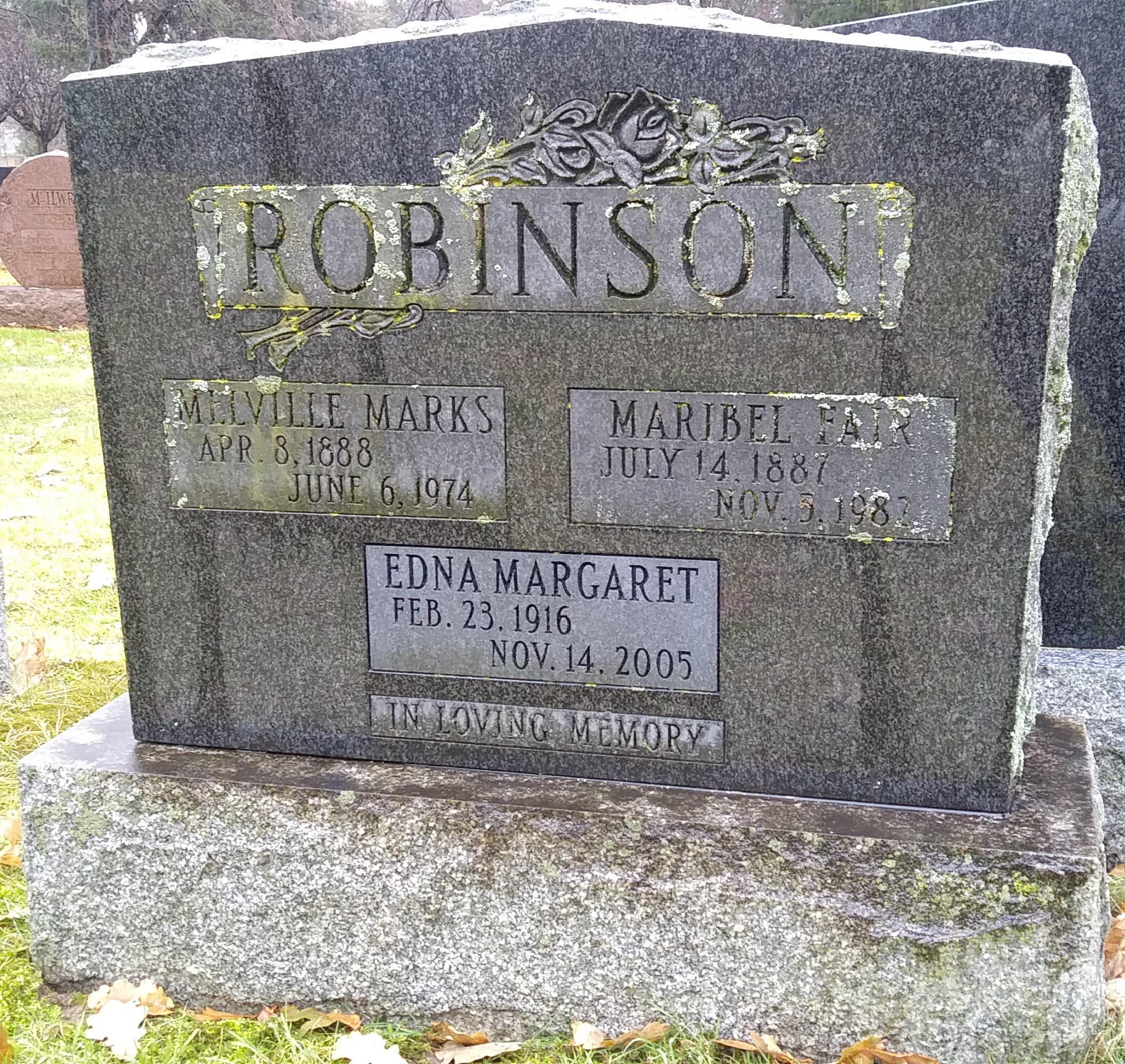
Robinson's grave marker at Greenwood Cemetery

He died in Burlington on June 6, 1974, and is buried in Greenwood Cemetery in Burlington.
