= Georgetown Hospital =

- Halton Healthcare
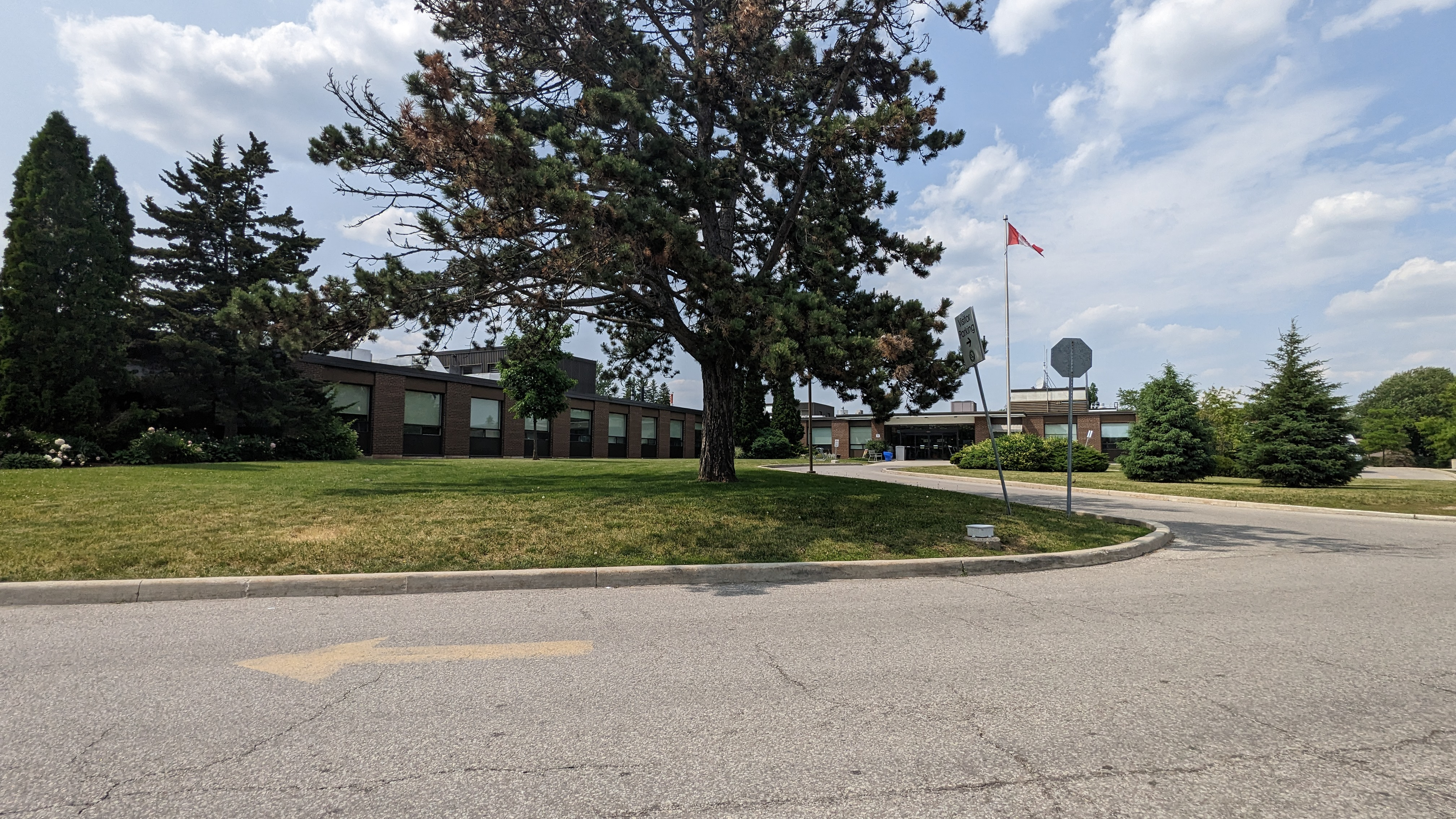

- Location in Ontario

Geography
- Location: Georgetown, Halton, Ontario, Canada
- Coordinates: 43.644444°N 79.934444°W

Organization
- Care system: Public Medicare (Canada) (OHIP)
- Type: Community
- Affiliated university: None

Services
- Emergency department: Yes
- Beds: 53

Helipads
- Helipad: TC LID: CNZ6

History
- Founded: 1961

Links
- Website: www.haltonhealthcare.com
- Lists: Hospitals in Canada

The Georgetown Hospital (or GH) is a community hospital located in the Georgetown area of Halton Hills, Ontario. It is one of three hospitals operated by Halton Healthcare.

Built on 17 acres (6.9 ha) of land, it opened in 1961 to serve the Halton Region, but today it also serves the communities of Peel Region.

== Services ==
The hospital provides the following services and procedures:

- Medical and Surgical Services
  - procedures involving general surgery, gynaecology, orthopaedics, ENT and urology
  - long-term patient care
- Supportive Housing
  - nurses and workers provide support to seniors living in designated apartments

This hospital should not be confused with Georgetown Hospital in Georgetown, Ascension Island.

In 2025, Halton Healthcare expanded its Outpatient Palliative Care Clinics to Georgetown Hospital, with the desire to bring end-of-life care closer to patients and their families so they can access vital support and comfort in their own community.
