= Cook County High School League =

The Cook County High School League in Chicago and its suburbs was one of the pioneer interscholastic leagues in the country. It came together during 1889–1890, conducting its first track and field meet in the spring of 1889, its first football championship in the fall of 1889, and its first baseball championship in the spring of 1890.

The formal date for the establishment of the Cook County High School Athletic League, which served Chicago and its suburbs, is 1898. Its creation, however, was really a matter of consolidation and rationalization of a conference that had already been in place for a decade. But even before the emergence of the Cook County League during 1889 and 1890, interscholastic competition of a sandlot variety had gone on for nearly a decade. During the years of this sandlot phase Chicago schoolboys were inventing interscholastic sports, undoubtedly patterning their approach after what they saw in the universities at the time.

The first two sports that Chicago area schools adopted for competition were—not surprisingly--football and baseball. No conclusive evidence has surfaced as to what year either sport was adopted, but it was probably sometime around 1881, at least for some of the suburban schools.

== Football ==
One should not imagine that the competition was anywhere near as organized as it is today. Instead, boys in each of the schools formed a club with an "eleven"—to use the vernacular of the day. The clubs then issued challenges to other schools to participate in games. There were no teachers, no coaches, no uniforms, no laid-out fields, and no schedules. There were various league set up during the 1880s, but they were of the sandlot variety and more often than not they never lasted through the season.

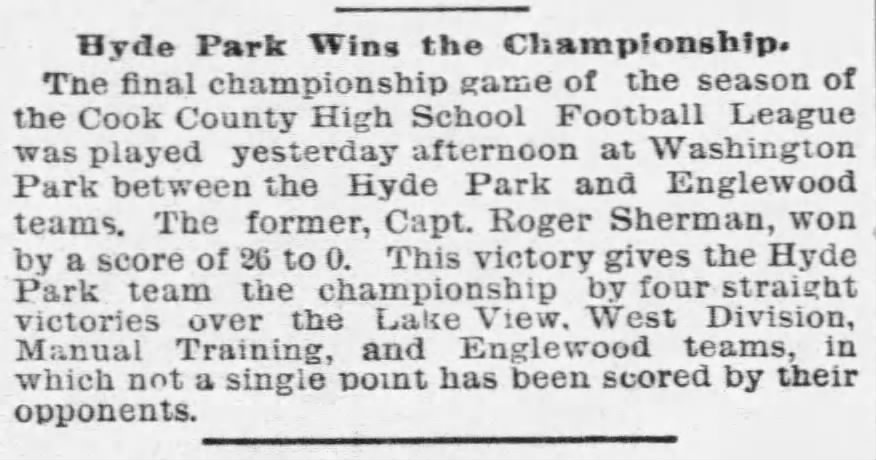
Hyde Park Wins the Championship, in the Chicago Tribune, November 1, 1889

A true football league was finally established in the fall of 1889, when the "Cook County High School Football League" was formed and a schedule of games adopted. Participating schools in the league were West Division, Hyde Park, Manual Training, Lake View, and Englewood. No longer were football games just a matter of a bunch of kids getting together for games. Hyde Park won the first Cook County championship, beating out neighboring Englewood, beginning one of the most legendary and intense rivalries in the history of Illinois high school football. The two schools dominated competition in football and other sports in the league. In the fall of 1890, South Division and Evanston joined the league and football was thoroughly established among Cook County high schools.

A true measure how well the game progressed in Chicago can be found by leaping ahead a few years to take a look at a couple intersectional competitions in which Cook County schools participated, in what were then pretentiously billed as "national championships." In the fall of 1902 Hyde Park, featuring the great Walter Eckersall at quarterback, slaughtered Brooklyn Polytechnic 105 to 0 at University of Chicago's Marshall Field. The Hyde Park coach was then hired by Polytechnic to coach their team for the following season. The following year North Division met Brooklyn Boys' High in New York and beat them 75 to 0, which was not as close as the score indicated according to the New York Times report.

== Baseball ==
The story of the development of baseball among Cook County schools was similar to that of football. There were several baseball leagues that were formed in the 1880s, but none of them lasted. In May and June 1889, however, there was a plethora of games reported in the Chicago Tribune, involving North Division, West Division, Manual Training, Hyde Park, and Northwest Division teams, but no league was evident. There is firm evidence of an organized league in 1890. Evanston, Englewood, Hyde Park, South Division, West Division, Manual Training, and Harvard met on February 7 and formed a conference. The person credited as being most instrumental in launching of the baseball league was Christian Miller, principal and baseball coach at Evanston High. He was an early advocate of athletic competition for schoolboys, and during the 1880s wrote such advocacy pieces for the education journals of the day. Evanston was the league champion and dominated the first several years of competition.

== Track and field ==
Track and field was the third sport to garner interscholastic interest, with the earliest references dating back to December 1886. The first activities were intramural field days conducted by such schools as Evanston, Hyde Park, and North Division. These activities by the various schools built up to an interscholastic field day on June 8, 1889, for all the Cook County schools. No team champion was determined, but the following year a team championship was recognized, Lake View.

Clearly track and field established itself during 1889 to 1891 as an organized sport in which participating schools thought themselves members of a Cook County conference, paralleling similar developments in football and baseball. During the 1890s, Lake View, Hyde Park, and Englewood dominated competition.

== Indoor baseball ==
Indoor baseball to the uninitiated was the predecessor sport of softball and popular in Chicago during the 1890s and during the first decade after the turn of the century. A 17-inch ball and a narrow bat was used so as to facilitate play inside armories and similarly large indoor facilities. (Later, when the game was moved outdoors, the ball's circumference was reduced to 16 inches.) The game had been invented by George Hancock in 1887 at the Farragut Boat Club on Chicago's South Side. By 1892 there were flourishing amateur leagues involving more than 100 teams in the city. Indoor baseball was a late development in the Cook County League. West Division had a team as early as 1892, but it was not until December, 1895, that representatives of ten schools formed a league.

Only five schools actually participated the first year—Austin, Lake View, Evanston, Oak Park, and English—because of the difficulty of the schools in obtaining playing facilities. The first year Austin won the banner. The sport was conducted annually until the demise of the league in 1913, and lingered on for two to three years afterwards.

One peculiarity of competition was how the high schools on the West Side—West Division (McKinley), English (Crane), Medill, and Austin—dominated the league. In the years 1907 to 1913, Crane High—with brothers Walter and Frank Halas and later brother George Halas (of professional football fame)--was in every title game and took the championship five of those seven years. Even the West Side girls got involved, because as early as 1895 West Division had a girls team and in 1899 was joined by another West Side school, Medill. The two schools competed against each other for a half decade or so.

== Tennis ==
Tennis never generated a lot of enthusiasm in Cook County schools, but it was a recognized sport early on. As early as 1884 Lake View High had a tennis club, and 1888 tennis was part of some of the high school intramural field days along with track and field events. On June 18, the Tribune reported on the "first annual tournament of the Cook County High School Lawn Tennis Association," held in Oak Park. Participating were Lake View, Englewood, English, Evanston, North Division, and Oak Park. The championship, both singles and doubles, was won by Oak Park. The next year there was no follow-up Cook County tourney. Instead a "Western Interscholastic Tennis Games" was held involving "high and preparatory schools" at the University of Chicago. Clearly, by 1894 tennis had been established as a regular sport among the Cook County schools, even though an annual tournament specifically for these schools was not being held. It was not until 1909 that the Cook County League again held a league-sponsored championship tourney. Tennis was a privileged sport and the pattern in most of the country showed greater development in the private schools than in the public schools.

== Basketball ==
In the Chicago area basketball did not take hold among the Cook County schools until 1895, and then curiously only as a girls sport. In the fall of 1895, Austin (and reportedly Englewood as well) started up teams and played against squads from University of Chicago, Lake Forest College, and Hull House. In the fall of 1896, Oak Park organized a team and the first interscholastic girls' game in Illinois, and perhaps the first in the nation, was played on December 18 between Oak Park and Austin. The extra year's experience of Austin was telling as Oak Park was beaten 16 to 4. Englewood and Evanston also joined in interscholastic competition that year. The 1898 constitution recognized girls' basketball as one of the league's sports, but it was not until February, 1900, that league competition leading to a championship was established. The teams competing in the league the first year were Austin, Englewood, Hyde Park, and West Division. Oak Park had a team but chose not to join that first year. Englewood beat Austin for the title in 1900.

The earliest schoolboy basketball in Illinois was played by an affiliated school of the University of Chicago, Morgan Park Academy, which was competing against its parent school and YMCAs during 1893 and 1894. Its enthusiasm for the game did not last, however, because in 1896 when the Morgan Park Academy helped form the Academic League the only sports played were football, baseball, tennis, and track and field. The earliest basketball played by a public high school was in 1896, when North Division competed against YMCAs and other athletic clubs.

Meanwhile, championship competition continued for the girls through the 1905–06 season, but the Victorian attitudes of educators put an end to it. Chicago superintendent of schools Edwin G. Cooley, who was making it his crusade to bring interscholastics under control, began putting pressure on the principals to stop the formation of the league in January, 1906. The girls managed to persevere with a league that season, probably with the support of sympathetic principals, but the following year Cooley prevailed and the league contests were ended, and schoolgirl basketball in the city went into rapid decline. A few schools, notably Hyde Park and North Division, continued to field teams to at least 1910.

Meanwhile, boys' competition grew dramatically after it finally took hold in 1900. The first interscholastic game on record in Illinois was that between Englewood and Elgin on March 2, 1900, and the very next year the game had mushroomed so much that a league of eight schools was formed—Englewood, English High, Evanston, Hyde Park, Marshall, Medill, North Division, and West Division. The number of schools steadily increased each year and the competition intensified until the demise of the league.

== End years ==
Other sports added by the league in subsequent years were cross country in 1908, soccer in the fall of 1910, and golf in 1911. In each case, however, competition in each sport preceded by several years the formal adoption by the league. Swimming competition under the sponsorship of private athletic clubs and YMCAs was conducted as early as 1902. In 1913 the suburban schools were expelled from the league and the Cook County League was reorganized as the Chicago Public High School League. Thus ended a great league that nurtured high school sports from infancy to maturity. The suburban schools formed the Suburban League (Chicago area).
