= 16-inch softball =

Variant of softball

16-inch softball (sometimes called clincher, mushball, cabbageball, puffball, blooperball, smushball, and Chicago ball) is a variant of softball, but using a larger ball that gradually becomes softer the more the ball is hit, and played with no gloves or mitts on the fielders. It more closely resembles the original game as developed in Chicago in the 19th century by George Hancock, and today it remains popular in Chicago.

The first set of rules was published in 1937 by the Amateur Softball Association, in the same manual as the rules for fastpitch softball.

== Game play ==
Game play for 16-inch softball is mostly consistent with standard softball game play. In contrast to a standard, or 12 in (30 cm) softball, which is 3.8 in (9.7 cm) in diameter, it is played with a ball 16 in (41 cm) in circumference, i.e. 5.1 in (13 cm) in diameter. It is common to see higher-arched pitching, and balls/strikes are determined by where the ball lands and crosses the batter's body. Leagues may form co-ed, all-male, or all-female teams. Additionally, teams may choose competitive or recreational leagues. There may be rule variations associated with the specific field or league of play. When playing in a co-ed league, there may be other rules that relate to the male-to-female ratio of team members and batting order. The National Softball Association (NSA) also has a published set of rules governing 16-inch softball play.

== History ==
The earliest known softball game of any kind was played at the Farragut Boat Club in Chicago on Thanksgiving Day 1887. The first softball was a wrapped up boxing glove and the bat was a broom. Play was encouraged by a reporter, George Hancock, who had been looking on. Harvard and Yale students played the game while waiting to hear the results of the annual Harvard-Yale football game.

Until the turn of the 20th century, ball sizes ranged from 12 to 17 inches in circumference. The 16-inch softball was eventually adopted in Chicago, perhaps because it did not travel as far as the popular 12- or 14-inch balls. This also may have allowed for play on smaller playgrounds or even indoors, accommodating the Chicago landscape and climate. Another possible advantage of the 16-inch ball was that it allowed everyone to play barehanded, and gloves were a rare luxury as the Great Depression hit Chicago particularly hard.

After the first national championship held in 1933 at the Century of Progress World's Fair, the sport grew in popularity. A professional league was formed that lasted through the 1950s. Teams drew crowds of over 10,000 each night. Leagues continue today but not at the same level of popularity. There are co-ed recreational leagues, competitive leagues and even a league for Chicago Public School students.

== League and tournament play ==
Many local organizations host regular season play, typically weekly games, as well as their own playoff systems. National organizations, such as the NSA, host a variety of tournaments. By placing well in NSA tournaments, teams can qualify and compete for the 16-inch softball world series. Because local leagues may have slight variations in rules, the NSA world series is played by its own set of world series rules. One notable change is that Chicago area players, who typically are not allowed to wear gloves, may choose to wear gloves in world series games.

== Blooperball ==
In the Bay City, Michigan, area the game is known as "blooperball". Blooperball has been played in the area continuously since the 1930s and there is a ten-team league for players forty years old and over, as well as a charity blooperball event called "The Rehab," which has been held the weekend after Labor Day for almost forty years.

== Hall of Fame ==
In 1996 Al Maag and Tony Reibel established the non-profit 16" Softball Hall of Fame. Since inception, the organization has held annual inductee dinners attended by over 600 guests. There is a museum in Forest Park, Illinois, a suburb of Chicago. Over 700 players have been inducted.

== Notable celebrities associated with the sport ==
- Chicago newspaper columnist Mike Royko loved 16-inch softball.
- United States Supreme Court Justice Elena Kagan played 16-inch softball while she was a member of the faculty at the University of Chicago Law School.
- Chicago radio host Steve Dahl
- Chicago rapper Serengeti
- NFL player John Galvin was inducted into the 16" Softball Hall of Fame.
