= John Galvin (quarterback) =

American football player (1920–1998)

- Galvin in 1959

No. 63
- Position: Quarterback

Personal information
- Born: December 7, 1920; Chicago, Illinois, U.S.
- Died: December 23, 1998 (aged 78); Largo, Florida, U.S.
- Listed height: 5 ft 10 in (1.78 m)
- Listed weight: 170 lb (77 kg)

Career information
- High school: Leo Catholic (Chicago)
- College: Purdue

Career history
- Baltimore Colts (1947)
- Stats at Pro Football Reference

John E. Galvin (December 7, 1920 – December 23, 1998) was an American professional football player who was a quarterback for the Baltimore Colts of the All-American Football Conference (AAFC). He played college football, baseball, and basketball for the Purdue Boilermakers. He was later a high school football coach and 16-inch softball player.

== Early life ==
John E. Galvin was born on December 7, 1920, in Chicago, Illinois. He played high school football and basketball at Leo Catholic High School in Chicago. In football, he was a tailback and punter. Galvin led Leo High to the 1937 Chicago Prep Bowl, which was attended by 120,000 people, the most all-time for a high school football game. He was later inducted into the Leo High School Hall of Fame.

== College career ==
Galvin enrolled at Purdue University to play college football for the Boilermakers. He was a three-year letterman at halfback from 1939 to 1941. He then served in the United States Army during World War II. Galvin returned to the Purdue football team in 1946, earning his fourth and final varsity letter. He also played college baseball at Purdue as a shortstop, and college basketball.

== Professional career ==
Galvin played in 13 games, starting one, for the Baltimore Colts of the All-American Football Conference (AAFC) in 1947, totaling three completions on six passing attempts for 34 yards, two kick returns for 38 yards, and 66 punts for 2,377 yards (36.0 average). His 66 punts were the most in the AAFC that year.

== Personal life ==
Galvin was the head football coach at Argo Community High School for 25 years. He also taught physical education, driver’s education, and spent some time as athletic director. He was inducted into the Chicago Catholic League Athletic Coaches Association Hall of Fame in 1976. In the 1990s, Argo High named its football field "John Galvin Memorial Field".

Galvin also played 16-inch softball and was inducted into the 16" Softball Hall of Fame. He died on December 23, 1998, in Largo, Florida.

== See also ==
- Early sports specialization – Multisport players are more likely to become successful professional athletes
