= George Hancock (softball) =

American inventor of indoor-outdoor baseball (1861–1936)

George Warren Hancock (1 March 1861 – 15 April 1936), at the time a reporter for Chicago Board of Trade, invented the game of softball in 1887. The first game was played, inside the Farragut Boat Club in Chicago. The first game of softball came from a football game between Yale and Harvard. When it was announced that Yale had won, Yale alumni, in excitement, threw a balled up boxing glove at a Harvard fan. The Harvard fan playfully swung at it as spectators looked on in interest.

George Hancock shouted, "Let's play ball," and tied the boxing glove into the shape of a ball. The men chalked a diamond shape onto the floor and broke a broom handle to serve as a bat. This is credited as the first softball game which was played on Thanksgiving Day November 24, 1887 after a Harvard-Yale football game that had been followed by telegraph.

Hancock's original game of indoor baseball quickly caught on in popularity, becoming international with the formation of a league in Toronto. That year, 1887, was also the premiere publication of the Indoor Baseball Guide. This was the first nationally distributed publication on the new game and it lasted a decade. In the spring of 1888, Hancock's game moved outdoors. It was played on a small diamond and called indoor-outdoor. Due to the sport's mass appeal, Hancock published his first set of indoor-outdoor rules in 1889.

== See also ==
- Cook County High School League
- Comparison of baseball and softball
- Fastpitch softball
- 16-inch softball
