= Softball =

Team ball sport

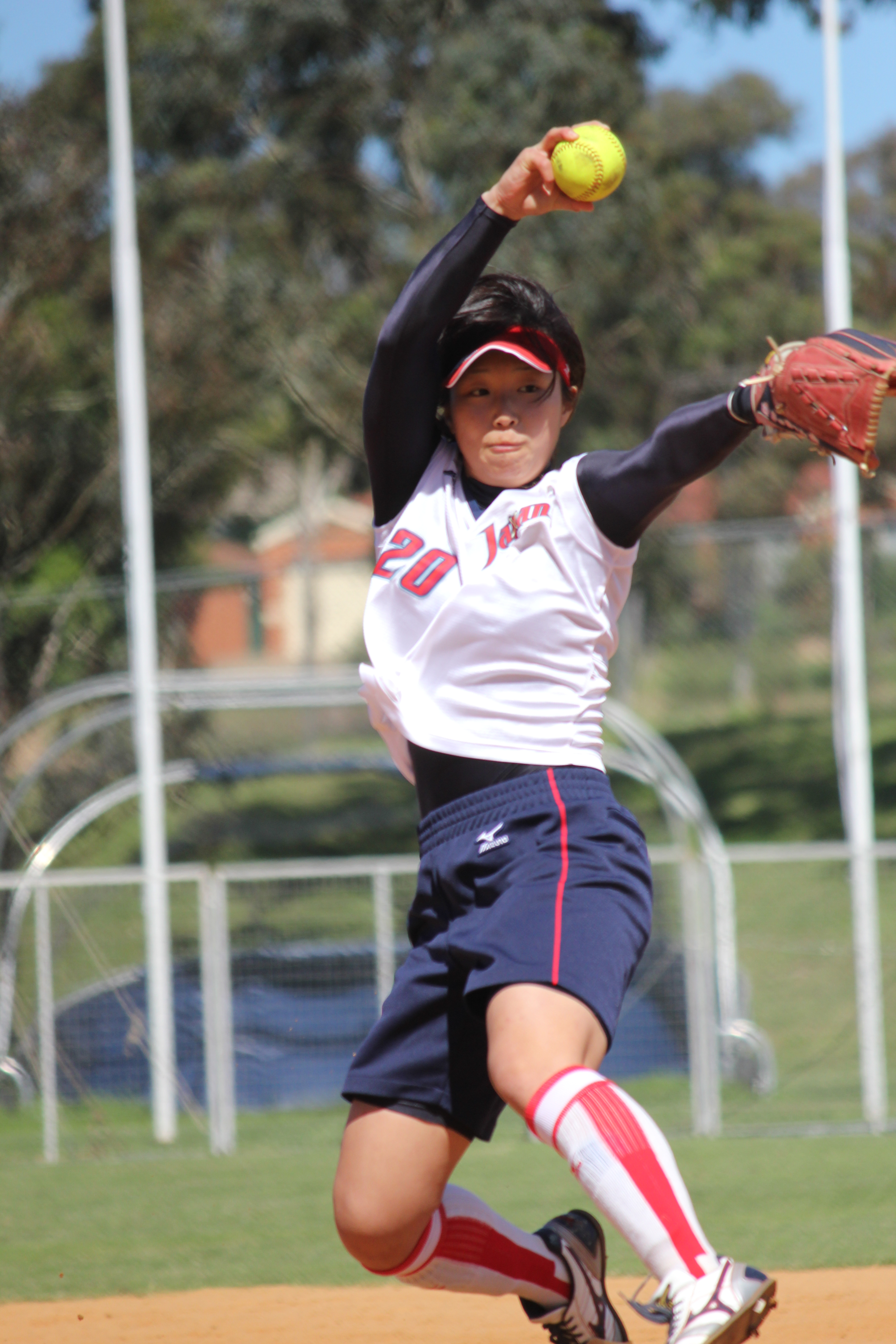
- A pitcher about to deliver a fastpitch (windmill pitch), where the ball is released while the hand is primarily below the ball
- Highest governing body: World Baseball Softball Confederation
- First played: 1887; 139 years ago, United States

Characteristics
- Contact: Limited
- Team members: 2 teams of 9 or 10
- Equipment: Softball; Softball bat; Softball helmet; Softball glove; Batting gloves

Presence
- Olympic: 1996–2008, 2020
- World Games: 1981, 1985, 2022–present Invitational: 2009–2013

Softball is a bat-and-ball sport played between two teams on a diamond-shaped field, who take turns batting and fielding. There are two primary forms: Fast-pitch and slow-pitch. In both forms, the pitcher throws the ball underhand to batters. In fast-pitch, the ball is typically thrown with a "windmill" motion and releasing the ball at hip level. Pitchers throw balls up to 78 miles per hour (124 km/h). Fast-pitch is played at the high school, collegiate, and professional levels. Women's fast-pitch softball was introduced to the Summer Olympic Games in 1996. Softball was not included in the 2024 Summer Olympics but will return for the 2028 Summer Olympics. Slow-pitch softball is commonly played in recreational leagues, with the ball being pitched at slow speeds and slightly simplified rules, making it an accessible sport for people of many ages.

Depending on the variety being played and the age and gender of the players, the particulars of the field and equipment will also vary. While distances between bases of 60 feet (18 m) are standard across varieties, the pitcher's plate ranges from 35 to 43 feet (10.7 to 13.1 m) away from home plate, and the home run fence can be 170 to 250 feet (52 to 76 m) away from home plate based on the players' age. The ball itself is typically 11 or 12 inches (28 or 30 centimetres) in circumference, though this also depends on specifics of the competition: for younger age categories, the ball is smaller. Softball rules vary in certain aspects from those of baseball. The game moves at a faster pace than traditional baseball due to the field being smaller and the bases and the fielders being closer to home plate. Softball is pitched underhand from flat ground, whereas baseball is pitched overhand from a raised pitcher's mound.

Softball is similar to baseball, but played with a larger ball on a smaller field. Additionally, softball games typically only last seven innings.

== History ==
=== Early history ===
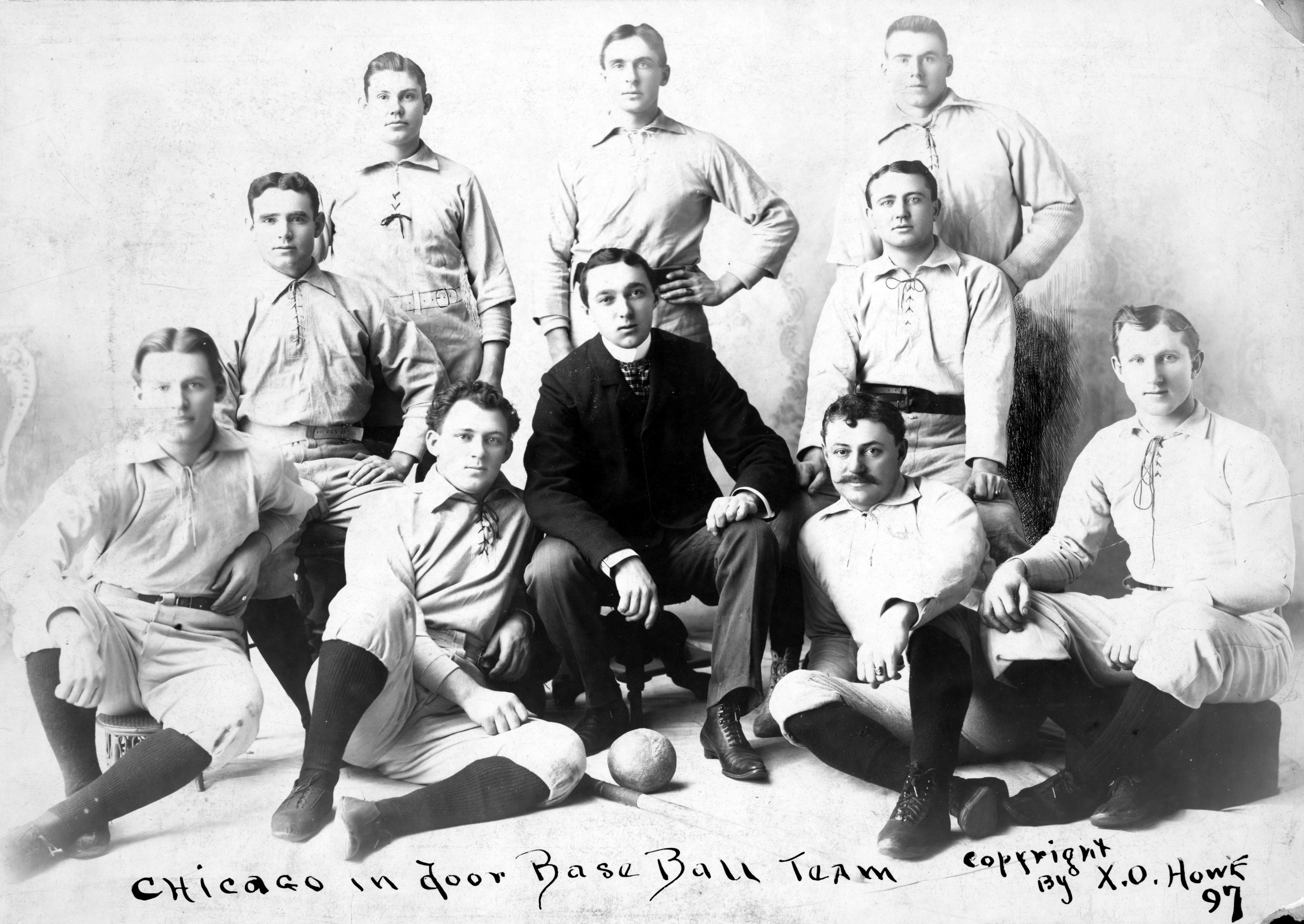
First photo of a softball team, Chicago, 1897

The earliest known softball game was played in Chicago, Illinois, on Thanksgiving Day, 1887. It took place at the Farragut Boat Club at a gathering to hear the outcome of the Yale University and Harvard University football game. When the score was announced and bets were settled, a Yale alumnus threw a boxing glove at a Harvard supporter. The Harvard fan grabbed a stick and swung at the rolled-up glove. George Hancock, a reporter there, called out "Play ball!" and the game began, with the boxing glove tightened into a ball, a broom handle serving as a bat. This first contest ended with a score of 41–40. The ball, being soft, was fielded barehanded.

Hancock is credited as the game's inventor for his development of a 17-inch ball and an undersized bat in the next week. The Farragut Club soon set rules for the game, which spread quickly to outsiders. Envisioned as a way for baseball players to maintain their skills during the winter, the sport was called "Indoor Baseball". Under the name of "Indoor-Outdoor," the game moved outside in the next year, and the first rules were published in 1889.

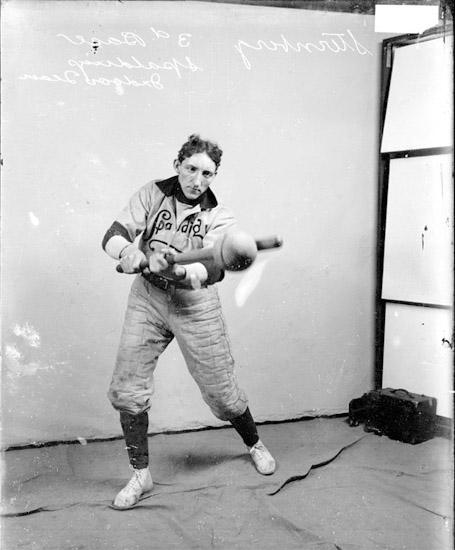
Indoor baseball player, 1907

In 1895, Lewis Rober Sr. of Minneapolis organized outdoor games as exercise for firefighters; this game was originally known as kitten ball. Rober's version of the game used a ball 12 inches (30 cm) in circumference, rather than the 16-inch (41 cm) ball used by the Farragut club, and eventually the Minneapolis ball prevailed, although the dimensions of the Minneapolis diamond were passed over in favor of the dimensions of the Chicago one. Rober may not have been familiar with the Farragut Club rules. Fire Station No. 19 in Minneapolis, Rober's post from 1896 to 1906, was listed on the National Register of Historic Places in part for its association with the sport's development. The first softball league outside the United States was organized in Toronto, Ontario, in 1897.

The name "softball" dates back to 1926. The name was coined by Walter Hakanson of the YMCA at a meeting of the National Recreation Congress. (In addition to "indoor baseball", "kitten ball", and "diamond ball", names for the game included "mush ball", and "pumpkin ball".) The name softball had spread across the United States by 1930. By the 1930s, similar sports with different rules and names were being played all over the United States and Canada. A tournament held in 1933 at the Chicago World's Fair spurred interest in the game. By 1936, the Joint Rules Committee on Softball had standardized the rules and naming throughout the United States. In this decade, American women transitioned from playing feminized versions of baseball to mainly playing softball.

Sixteen-inch softball, also sometimes referred to as "mush ball" or "super-slow pitch" and is a direct descendant of Hancock's original game. Defensive players are not allowed to wear fielding gloves. Sixteen-inch softball is played extensively in Chicago, where devotees such as newspaper columnist Mike Royko consider it the "real" game, and New Orleans. In New Orleans, sixteen-inch softball is called "Cabbage Ball" or "batter ball" and is a popular team sport in area elementary and high schools.

The first cork-centered softball was created in Hamilton, Ontario, Canada, by Emil "Pops" Kenesky.

=== Contemporary era ===
By the 1940s, fast pitch began to dominate the game. Although slow pitch was present at the 1933 World's Fair, the main course of action taken was to lengthen the pitching distance. Slow pitch achieved formal recognition in 1953 when it was added to the program of the Amateur Softball Association, and within a decade had surpassed fast pitch in popularity.

The first British women's softball league was established in 1953.

The National Softball Hall of Fame and Museum was opened in Oklahoma City, United States, in 1957.

In 1991, women's fast pitch softball was selected to debut at the 1996 Summer Olympics. The 1996 Olympics also marked a key era in the introduction of technology in softball. The IOC funded a landmark bio-mechanical study on pitching during the games.

In 2002, sixteen-inch slow pitch was written out of the International Softball Federation (ISF) official rules, although it is still played extensively in the United States under The Amateur Softball Association of America, or ASA rules.

The 117th meeting of the International Olympic Committee, held in Singapore in July 2005, voted to drop softball and baseball as Olympic sports for the 2012 Summer Olympics. They were reinstated for the 2020 Summer Olympics held in 2021.

The highest governing body for the sport is the World Baseball Softball Confederation (WBSC). Other sanctioning bodies are USA Softball, NCAA, NFHS, AAU, NSA, PONY, Babe Ruth League, ISC, USSSA and Triple Crown.

== Overview ==
=== Field ===
A softball game

Fastpitch softball is played between two teams on a large field, with nine players from one team on the field at a time. Slow-pitch softball is played with ten fielders but can be played with nine if needed.

The softball field is usually composed of a dirt or brick dust infield that contains the shape and running areas of a diamond and a grass outfield. However, the field can consist of other solid and dry surfaces such as artificial turf or asphalt. There are four bases on the infield: First base, second base, third base, and home plate. The bases are arranged in a square and are typically 60 feet (18 m) apart. Near the center of this square is the pitcher's circle, and within the circle is the "rubber" or "plate", a flat, flush-mounted, rectangular rubber plate 6 inches (150 mm) in width and 24 inches (610 mm) in length. The rubber distance from the plate in fastpitch can be as short as 35 feet (11 m) for 10u players up to 43 feet (13 m) for ages 14 and older. In slow pitch softball, the rubber distance can be 43, 46 or 50 feet (13, 14 or 15 m) depending on age level and the league one is playing in.

=== Game structure ===
The object of the game is to score more runs (points) than the other team by batting (hitting) a ball into play and running around the bases, touching each one in succession. The ball is a sphere of light material, covered with leather or synthetic material. It is 11 to 12 inches (28–30 cm) (or, rarely, 16 in or 41 cm) in circumference depending on age group. The game is typically officiated by two or more neutral umpires, but in some instances there will only be one. Players and umpires are generally free to ask for a brief stoppage at any time when the ball is not in play (called a time out), or immediately following a play once its outcome is clear.

The game is played in usually seven innings. Each inning is divided into a top half, in which the away team bats and tries to score runs, while the home team occupies the field and tries to record three outs; then a bottom half, when the teams' roles are reversed. Some leagues play with a reduced number of innings or with a time limit, rather than the traditional seven innings. When a team is hitting they are on the offensive side, and when a team is in the field they are on the defensive side.

=== Batting and pitching ===
Before the game begins, each coach must create the order players will bat in, and what positions they will play. This list is often called a "line-up", and can be changed throughout the game with a substitution. However, players must not switch positions or batting order without the coach making the umpire aware.

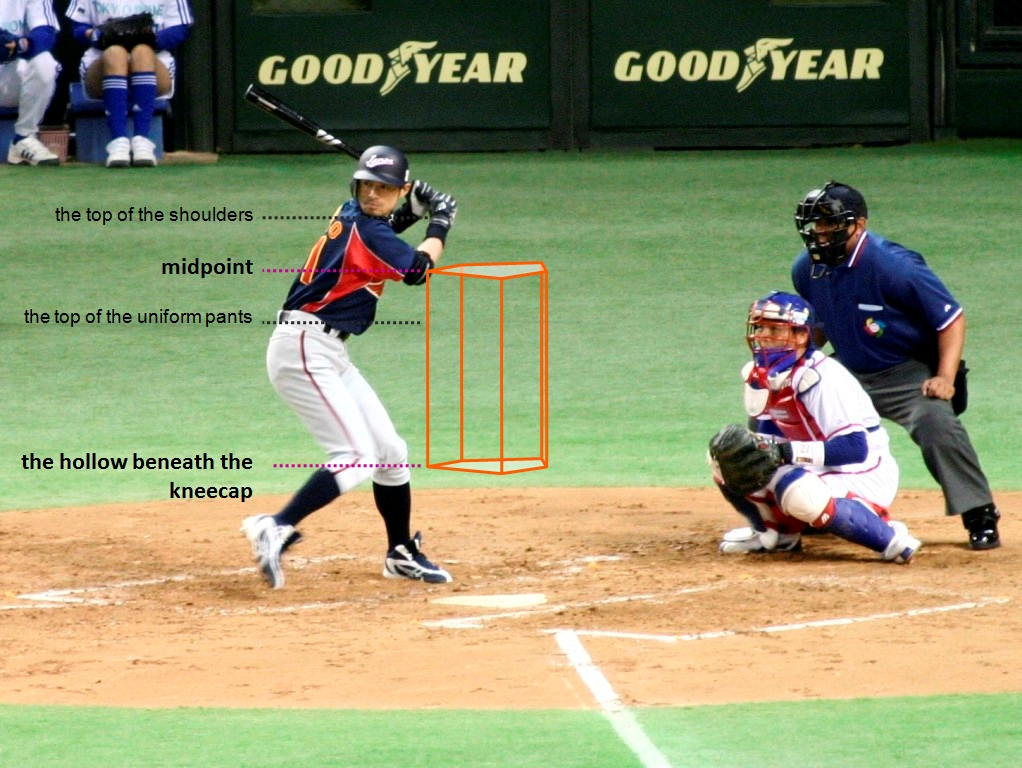
The strike zone hovers above home plate, varying in dimensions based on the batter's height.

To start play, the first batter for the 'away' team is sent to home plate. The defense's pitcher stands atop the rubber and pitches the ball towards home plate using an underhand motion. In fast pitch, the pitcher is allowed to take one step back prior to releasing the ball during the forward movement. The batter attempts to hit the pitched ball with a bat, a long, round, smooth stick made of metal or composite. The pitcher will use all types of pitches when on the mound to try and strike out the batter (fastball, changeup, riseball, dropball, curveball and screwball). There are a few ways to get a batter out, the first being the pitcher throws three strikes against a batter. A strike is recorded any time a batter swings and misses a pitch, when a batter hits a foul ball (out of play), or when the batter does not swing at a pitch that crosses home plate within an area known as the strike zone. In fast pitch, to be within the strike zone, the pitch must cross over home plate, and as it crosses it must be above the knees and slightly below the shoulders (roughly the armpit or the shirt logo). The strike zone therefore varies from batter to batter, and is often up to the umpire's discretion. In slow pitch, the ball must land on a carpet or marked area behind the plate, therefore standardizing the strike zone. A pitch outside the strike zone is a ball. If the batter reaches four balls, the batter is awarded the first base in what is known as a walk. The umpire behind home plate is the sole arbiter of balls and strikes. A foul ball may or may not result in a strikeout depending on the association and local league rules. However, bunting a foul ball when the batter has two strikes will result in a strikeout. In some associations and leagues, bunting is entirely disallowed and results in an out. Also, if a player has two strikes, swinging and partially hitting the ball can result in an out if the catcher manages to catch the tipped ball.

=== Ball in play ===
The batter attempts to swing the bat and hit the ball fair (into the field of play). After a successful hit the batter becomes a base runner (or runner) and must run to first base. When base running, runners must attempt to advance if there are no open bases behind them; for example, a runner on first base must run to second base if the batter puts the ball in play. If there is an open base behind them, they may advance at their own risk. There are many ways that defense can make an out, the most common being; they can tag the runner with the ball, make a force out, or catch the ball in the air. To make the play, the fielder must field the ball and may throw the ball freely between players, so one player can field the ball while another moves to a position to put out the runner. When the defense is tagging the runner, they must either physically touch a runner with the ball, or the touch a runner with the ball firmly in the glove. The defense can also touch bases while in possession of the ball to get a runner out, also known as a force out. To be able to make this play, the runner must be running either to first base, or has another runner on the base behind them. For example, a runner on first would have to run to second if the ball was put into play. During force outs, a runner is said to be thrown out when the play involves two or more defensive players. In such a situation, the defense can throw to the base that the lead runner is attempting to take (a force out), and the defense can then also throw to the previous base. This can result in a multiple-out play: a double play is two outs, while a triple play, a very rare occurrence, is three outs. Runners with an open base behind them are not forced to advance and do so at their own risk; the defense must tag such runners directly to put them out rather than tagging the base.

The last way to get a hitter out is a ball hit in the air and caught before hitting the ground, in fair or foul territory. A fly ball is a ball hit high and deep, a pop fly is a ball hit high but short, and a line drive is a ball hit horizontally (resembles a line). After the catch, runners must return to their original bases; if the defense throws the ball to that base before the runner returns, the runner is out as well, resulting in a double play. A runner who remains on the base until the ball is touched, or returns to the base (tags up) after the catch, may try to advance to the next base, at the risk of being tagged out between bases. As in baseball, the infield fly rule applies in some game situations to prevent the defense from recording multiple force outs by deliberately dropping an easy catch.

Offensive strategy is mostly from the order of the line-up, and to simply hit the ball skillfully to let the batter reach base and advance other runners around the bases to score runs. The count of balls and strikes indicates how aggressive the batter should be. Additionally, more advanced levels of the sport will attempt to place the ball (hit the ball to a certain area on the field) based on where runners are. The offense may try to sacrifice, with the batter deliberately making an out in order to advance runners. Defensive strategy is more complex, as particular situations (number of outs and positions of base-runners) and particular batters call for different positioning of fielders and different tactical decisions. The defense may decide to allow a run if it can achieve one or multiple outs.

== Playing field ==
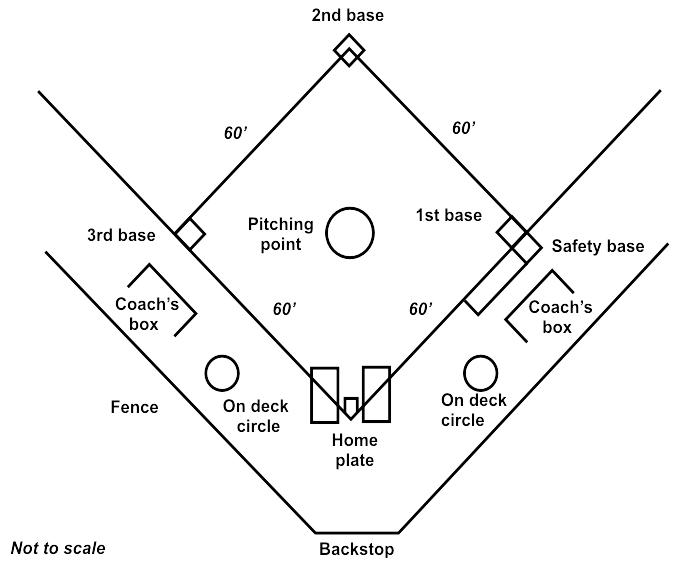
Diagram of a softball diamond

The playing field is divided into fair territory and foul territory. Fair territory is further divided into the infield, and the outfield.

The field is defined by foul lines that meet at a right angle at home plate. The minimum length of the baselines varies classification of play (see below for official measurements). A fence running between the baselines defines the limits of the field; distance from home plate to the fence varies by field. The widest part of the field is the distance between the foul poles, which are erected where the foul lines meet the fence and are about 310 to 420 feet (94 to 128 m) apart depending on the length of the foul lines.

Home plate is one corner of a diamond with bases at each corner. The bases are cushions 15 inches (38 cm) square, of canvas or a similar material, and not more than 5 inches (13 cm) thick. The bases are usually securely fastened to the ground. The bases are numbered counterclockwise as first base, second base, and third base. Often, but not always, outside first base (that is, in foul territory) and adjacent and connected to it, there is a contrast-colored "double base" or "safety base" intended to prevent collisions between the first baseman and the runner. The runner runs for the foul portion of the double base after hitting the ball while the fielding team tries to throw the ball to the fair portion before the runner reaches the safety base. However, not all softball diamonds have these safety bases and they are much more common in women's softball than in men's. The double base is required in the U-18 Women's Softball World Cup.

The infield consists of the diamond and the adjacent space in which the infielders (see below) normally play. The outfield is the remaining space between the baselines and between the outfield fence and the infield. The infield is usually "skinned" (dirt), while the outfield has grass in regulation competitions.

Near the center of the diamond is the pitching plate, or colloquially "rubber". In fastpitch, a circle 16 feet (4.9 meters) in diameter known as the pitching circle is marked around the pitching plate.

A field is officially required to have a warning track between 15 and 12 feet (4.6 and 3.7 meters) from the outfield fence. However, if the game is being played on a field larger than required, no warning track is required before the temporary outfield fencing.

Located in foul territory outside both baselines are two coach's boxes. Each box is behind a line 15 feet (4.6 meters) long located 12 feet (3.7 meters) from each baseline.

=== Official baseline dimensions ===
Fast pitch	Slow pitch	Wheelchair
60 feet (18.29 m)	60 to 70 feet (18.29 to 21.34 m) depending on the association and level of play	50 feet (15.24 m)

=== Pitching distances ===
Slow pitch pitching distances
Adult	Youth		Kids		Wheelchair
	13–19 years	10–12 years	7–9 years	<7 years	
50 feet (15.24 m)	50 feet (15.24 m)	46 feet (14.02 m)	43 feet (13.11 m)	Coach pitch	28 feet (8.53 m)

Fast pitch pitching distances
Adult
Female	Male
43 feet (13.11 m)	46 feet (14.02 m)
Under 16
43 feet (13.11 m)
12 and under
40 feet (12.19 m)
10 and under
35 feet (10.67 m)
8 and under
Coach pitch

== Equipment ==
Equipment required in softball includes a ball, a bat (composite or metal), gloves, uniforms and protective gear. Hitters must wear a helmet when hitting. Also, catchers must wear protective gear, including; helmet, chest plate and knee/shin guards. Sliding shorts, face masks and knee sliders is often worn for softball as part of the uniform or protective gear, although not required to play.

=== Ball ===
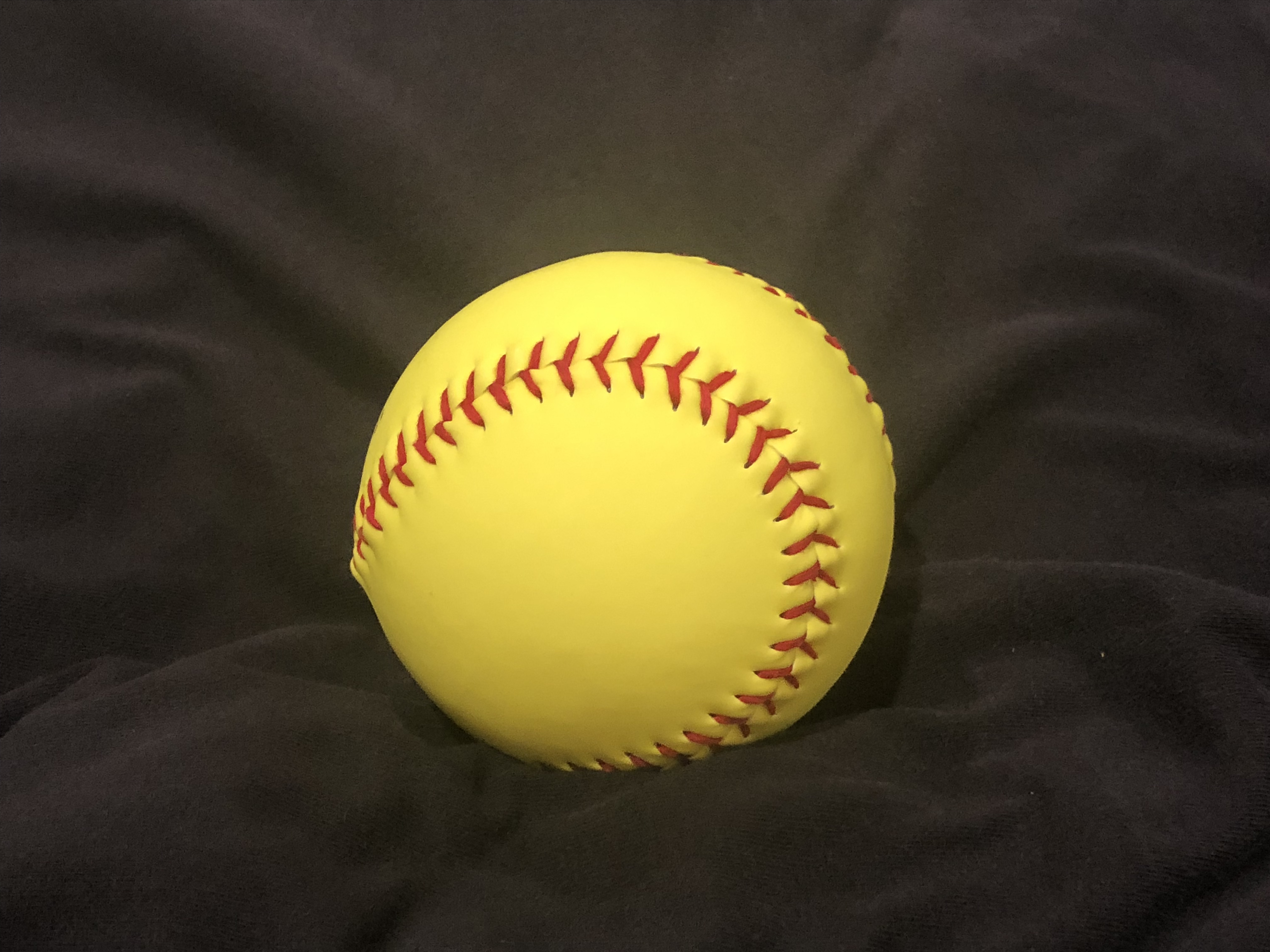
A modern optic yellow softball

Despite the sport's name, the ball is not actually soft, though it does have a lower density and greater coefficient of restitution than a baseball.

The size of the ball varies according to the variety played and age of the participants. The circumference for fastpitch for adults is 12±0.125 in (30.5±0.3 cm), with a mass between 6.25 and 7.0 oz (177 and 198 g), while children under 12 use a ball with a circumference of 11±0.125 in (27.9±0.3 cm) with a mass between 5.875 and 6.125 oz (166.6 and 173.6 g). A 12-inch circumference ball is generally used in slow pitch. (For comparison, a baseball is 9 to 9 1/4 inches (229–235 mm) in circumference and has a mass between 5 and 5 1/4 ounces (142–149 g).)

The ball is covered in two pieces of leather or similar synthetic covering that are roughly the shape of a figure-8 and sewn together along a continuous seam. The core of the ball may be made of long fiber kapok, a mixture of cork and rubber, a polyurethane mixture, or another approved material.

Before 1993, white balls were standard at all levels of play. In that year, a new, fluorescent optic yellow colored ball was first used in college softball. Yellow softballs have become the standard for all levels of play; white balls are also still allowed but are very uncommon today.

In Chicago, where softball was invented, it remains traditional to play a variant of slow-pitch with a ball 16 inches (41 centimeters) in circumference. The fielders do not wear gloves or mitts. A 16-inch softball when new is rough and hard, with hand and finger injuries to fielders frequent if they do not "give" when receiving a ball, but the ball "breaks in" slightly during a game and continues to soften over time with continued play. A well-broken-in ball is called a mush ball and is favored for informal "pick-up" games and when playing in limited space, such as a city street (because the ball does not go as far). A 16-inch ball is also used for wheelchair softball.

=== Bat ===
The bat used by the batter can be made of wood, aluminum, or composite materials such as carbon fiber. Wooden bats are not allowed in all leagues, and there are typically "wooden-bat leagues" to increase fairness. Sizes may vary but they may be no more than 34 inches (86 cm) long, 2.25 inches (5.7 cm) in diameter, or 38 ounces (1.1 kg) in mass. The standard barrel diameter for both slow pitch and fast pitch softball bats is 2 1/4 inches. Many players prefer a smaller barrel, which reduces mass and allows higher swing speed.

Although there are a variety of bats used, there are several that are banned due to performance enhancement. For example, with a thinner wall, the ball recoils faster off the bat, allowing it to travel further. Many bats may be "doctored" or "juiced" by being end loaded, shaved, or painted. End loading of a cap refers to the addition of weight manually placed at the end of the barrel to distribute more weight at the tip. Shaving bats require machine use in order to remove the inner walls of the bat to improve elasticity, but shaving weakens bats' durability. Lastly, illegal bats may be painted to resemble legal ones.

=== Gloves ===
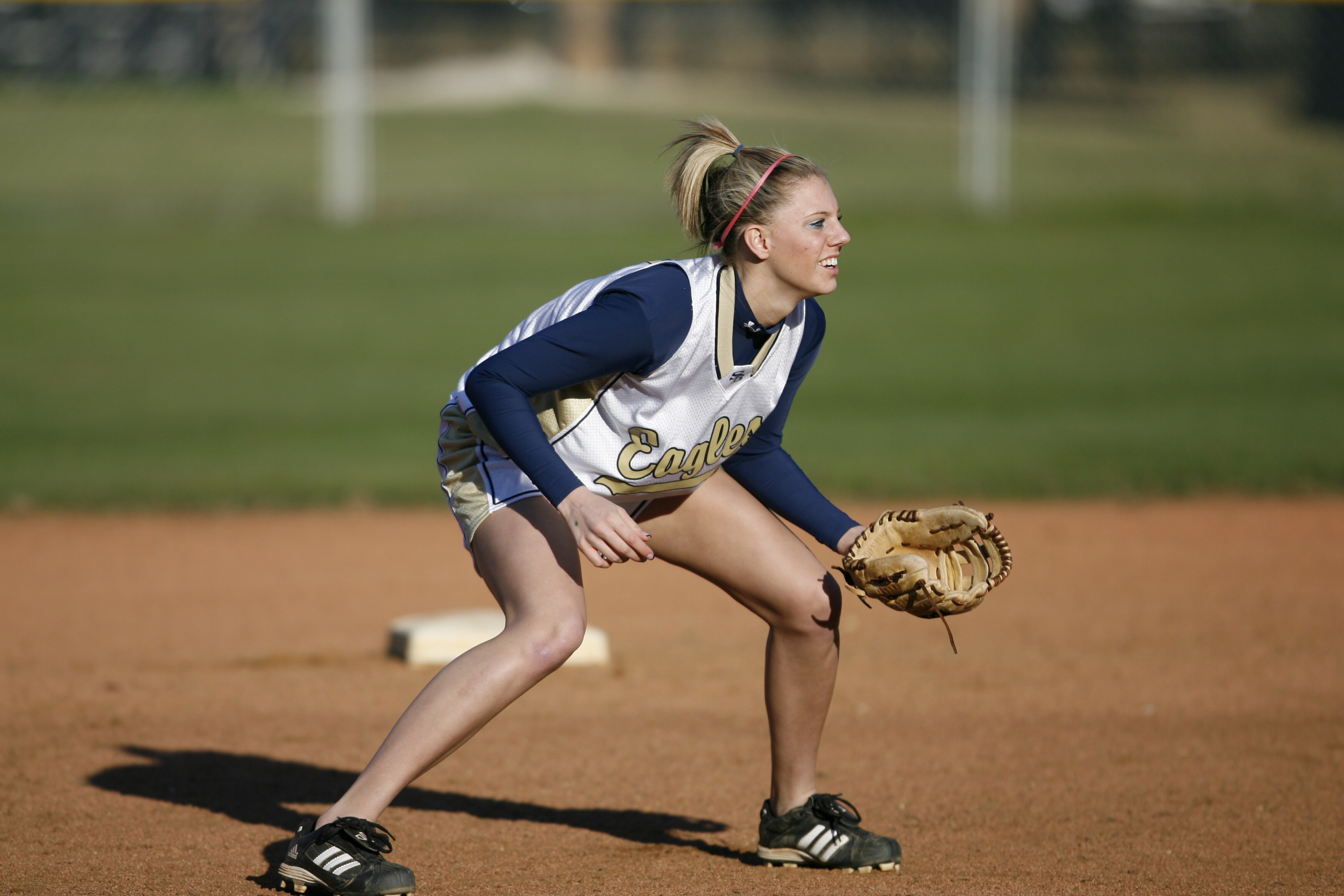
Fielding in softball

All defensive players wear fielding gloves, made of leather or similar material. Gloves have webbing between the thumb and forefinger, known as the "pocket". Gloves used in softball are typically larger than the ones used in baseball to account for the larger ball. No glove larger than 14 in (36 cm) can be used in ASA (American Softball Association) sanctioned play.

While extremely rare in recreational play, there are sometimes different size gloves for different positions on the field. Catchers and first baseman have what is called a mitt, whose pockets are larger than other gloves. These are more padded. An outfielder's glove is smaller than the catcher's, typically 12 inches to 13 inches for fast pitch softball or 12 to 15 inches for slow pitch. An infielder's glove is the smallest, typically from 11.5 inches to 13 inches. A pitcher's glove is typically 11.5 to 12.5 inches for fast pitch or 11.5 to 13 inches for slow pitch.

No part of the glove is allowed to be the same color as that of the ball, including that of its seams. Pitchers are also not allowed to have any white on their gloves including the seams. The umpire has discretion to determine whether any coloring on the glove interferes with or hinders the batter from seeing the ball clearly.

=== Uniform ===
Each team wears a distinctive uniform. The uniform may include a cap, a shirt displaying team colors and the players' number, sliding undershorts/compression shorts (optional), socks, and pants/athletic shorts. The team is required to have all of its members wear the same uniform.

Caps, visors, and headbands are optional for female players if playing over 12U in a rec softball league, and have to be the same color. Caps are mandatory for male players. A fielder who chooses to wear a helmet or face mask is not required to wear a cap.

Many players use "sliding shorts", otherwise known as compression shorts in other sports. These can be outfitted with a pouch for fitting a protective cup for male players. These shorts also help to protect the upper thigh when sliding into a base. "Sliders" may also be worn for similar protection. These are somewhat padded shin guards that extend usually from the ankle to the knee of the wearer and wrap all the way around the leg(s). They protect the shin, calf, etc. from getting bruised or damaged while sliding into home plate and make it much more comfortable to slide into the plate. Some male players use long, baseball-style pants. However, some female players now wear a shorter version of baseball pants.

At the back of the uniform, an Arabic numeral from numbers 0 through 99 must be visible. Dependent on the league and level of play, numbers such as 02 and 2 are considered identical. Also, on the back of the uniform's players' names are optional.

All players are required to wear shoes. They may have cleats or spikes. The spikes must extend less than 0.75 in (19 mm) away from the sole. Rounded metal spikes are illegal, as are ones made from hard plastic or other synthetic materials. High school athletes are sometimes permitted to wear metal cleats, such as in Ohio. Most of the time players wear metal when playing at higher levels. This can be due to the better stability and grip they provide.

Many recreational leagues prohibit the use of metal cleats or spikes to reduce the possible severity of injuries when a runner slides feet-first into a fielder. At all youth (under 15) levels, in co-ed (the official terminology for mixed teams) slow pitch, and in modified pitch, metal spikes are usually not allowed.

=== Protective equipment ===
Batters and runners wear batting helmets. In NCAA fastpitch softball, players have the option to wear a helmet with or without a face mask. Most female travel ball teams for fastpitch softball require the batter to wear a helmet with a face mask. In male fastpitch masks are generally only used for medical reasons.

In fastpitch, the catcher wears a protective helmet with a face mask and throat protector, shin guards, and chest protector. Shin guards also protect the kneecap. In youth level slow pitch, the catcher must wear a helmet, chest protector, and mask. At adult levels, there is no formal requirement for the catcher to wear a mask, although the official rules recommend it. A catcher may optionally wear a body protector in adult slow pitch. Catchers can also wear knee-savers, however, the higher you go up in age the less likely you will be to see them. Whether or not to use knee-savers is a big controversy. Many believe that they can cause harm to the knee by creating space between the tibia and femur, while there is no concrete evidence of this. Whether or not a catcher decides to use knee-savers is mostly just preference.

While mandatory for the pitcher in some slow pitch leagues, there is an option to wear a face mask on the field. It is recommended in lower age groups. This is intended to prevent facial injuries.

Protective equipment

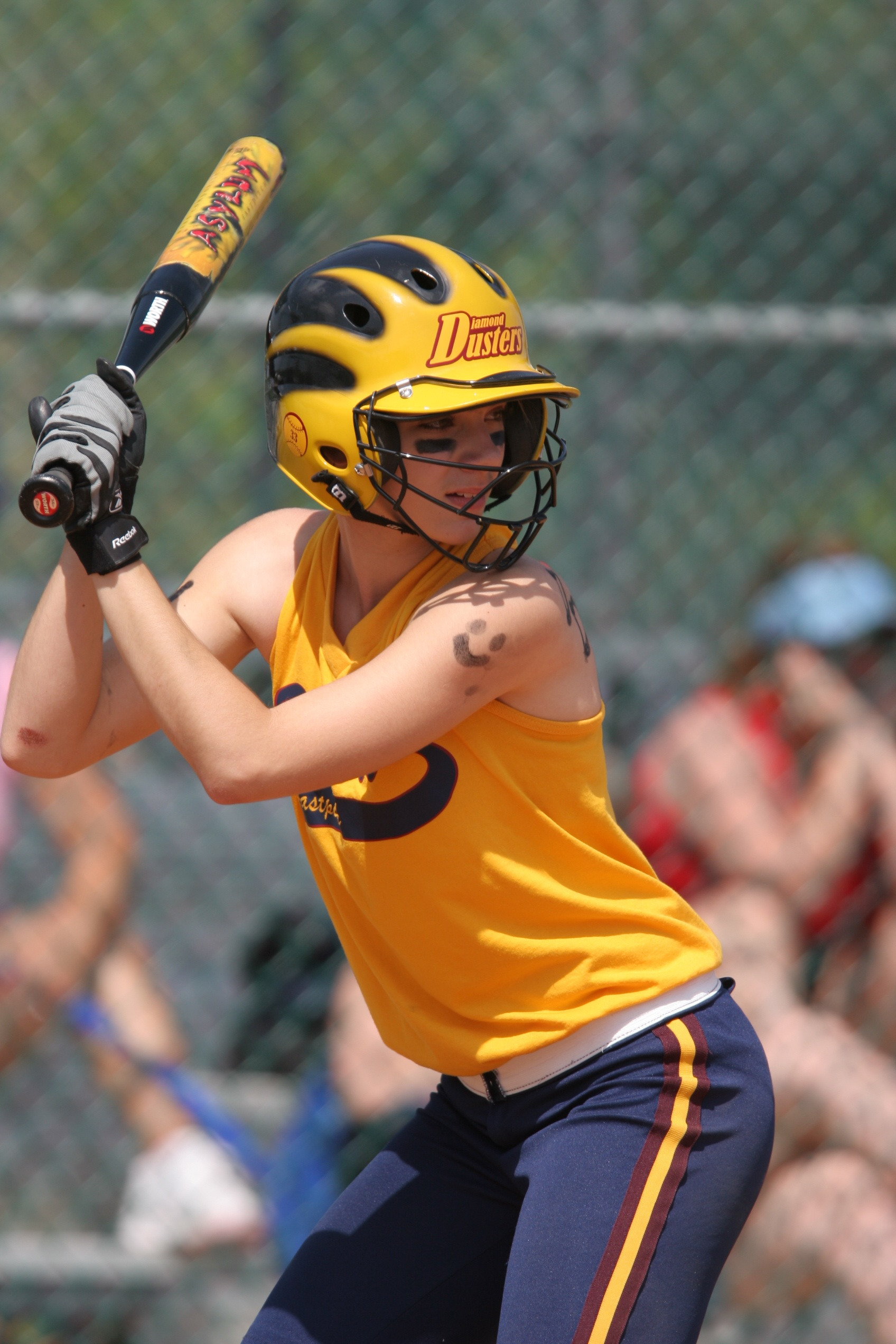
Fastpitch batter with masked helmet

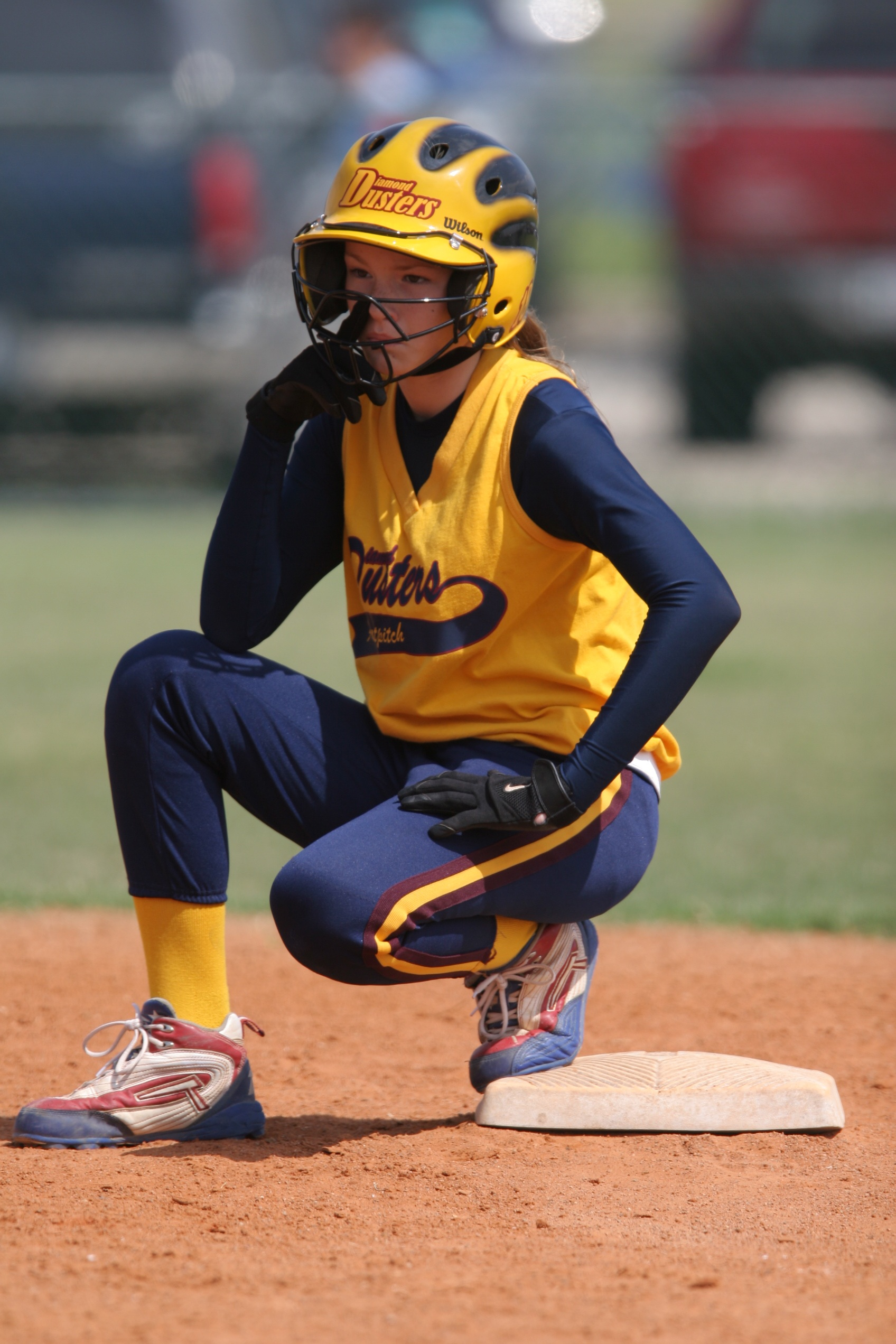
Runner in masked helmet

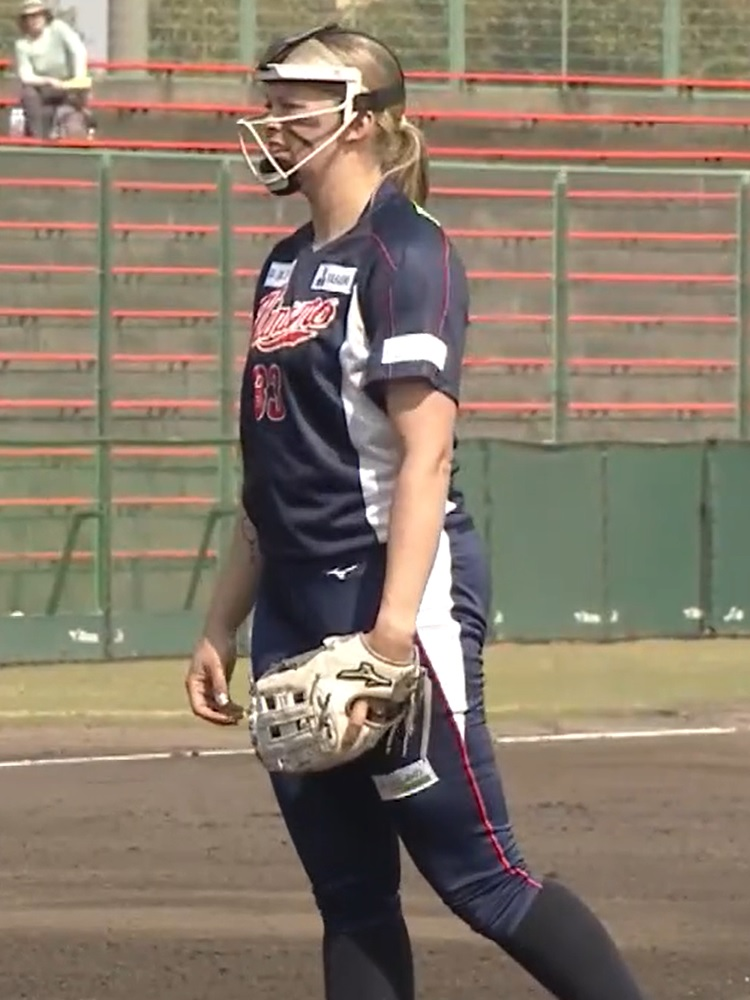
Pitcher with facemask

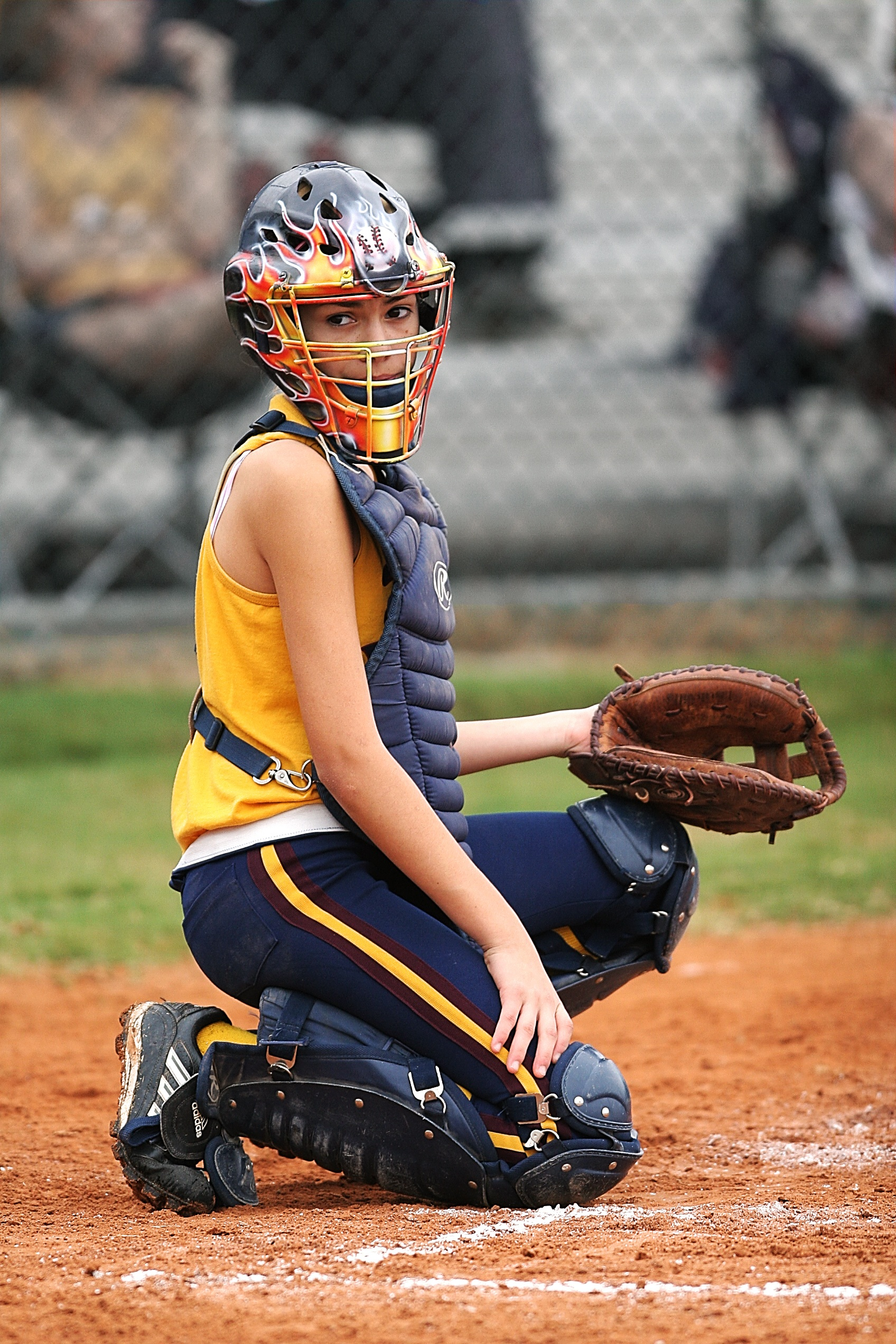
Catcher wearing a helmet and chest protector

== Umpires ==
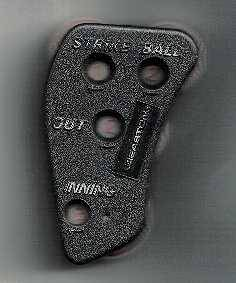
The plate umpire often uses an indicator (sometimes called a clicker or counter) to keep track of the game.

Decisions about plays are made by umpires. The number of umpires on a given game can range from a minimum of one to a maximum of seven. There is never more than one "plate umpire"; there can be up to three "base umpires", and up to a further three umpires positioned in the outfield. Most fastpitch games use a crew of two umpires (one plate umpire, one base umpire).

Official umpires are often nicknamed "blue", because of their uniforms – in many jurisdictions, most significantly ISF, NCAA and USA Softball games, umpires wear navy blue slacks, a light powder blue shirt, and a navy baseball cap. Some umpires wear a variant of the uniform: some umpires in USA Softball wear heather gray slacks and may also wear a navy blue or powder blue shirt; umpires from the USSSA wear red shirts with grey slacks; National Softball Association (NSA) umpires wear an official NSA white-colored umpire shirt with black pants or black shorts; NSA fastpitch umpires wear the white NSA umpires shirt and heather gray slacks.

Decisions are usually indicated by both the use of hand signals, and by vocalizing the call. Safe calls are made by signaling with flat hands facing down moving away from each other, and a verbal call of "safe". Out calls are made by raising the right hand in a clenched fist, with a verbal call of "out". Strikes are called by the plate umpire, who uses the same motion as the out call with a verbal call of "strike". Balls are only called verbally, with no hand gesture. The umpire also has the option of not saying anything on a ball. It is understood that when he stands up, the pitch was not a strike. Foul balls are called by extending both arms up in the air with a verbal call of "foul ball", while fair balls are indicated only by pointing towards fair territory with no verbal call. No signal is given for balls that are obviously foul; for closer calls that are not borderline a signal is given.

Almost all decisions made by the umpire(s) are considered to be final. If a coach thinks a base umpire made an incorrect call, they may protest and the umpires will discuss. Protesting doesn't always change the call, but there is a possibility. One instance this may happen is a tag at third, the home umpire might have a better view than the base umpire. At some tournaments there might be a rules interpreter or Tournament Chief Umpire (TCU) (also known as the Umpire In Chief, or UIC) available to pass judgment on such protests, but it is usually up to the league or association involved to decide if the protest would be upheld. Protests are never allowed on what are considered "judgment calls" – balls, strikes, and fouls. However, if a hitter half swings, the catcher may ask the home umpire to check with the field umpire to ensure the call, as they may have a better view. As of the 2021–22 academic year, a coach of an NCAA team is allowed to protest a call made by the umpire through what is called "video review" during the game. The opposing team only has until the next pitch to initiate the protest, and they are only allowed two a game.

== Gameplay ==
A softball game can last anywhere from 3 to 7 innings, or 1–2 hours depending on the league, rules, and type of softball. The teams take turns batting. Officially, which team bats first is decided by a coin toss, although a league may decide otherwise at its discretion. The most common rule is that the home team bats second. Batting second is also called last at-bat. Many softball players prefer to bat second because they feel they have more control in the last inning, and ensures that the other team doesn't have a chance to make a comeback.

In the event of a tie, extra innings are usually played until the tie is broken except in certain tournaments and championships. If the home team is leading and the road team has just finished its half of the seventh inning, the game ends because it is not necessary for the home team to bat again. In all forms of softball, the defensive team is the fielding team; the offensive team is at bat or batting and is trying to score runs.

=== Pitching ===
Play often, but not always, begins with the umpire saying, "play ball". After the batter is ready and all fielders (except the catcher) are in fair territory at their respective positions, the pitcher stands at the pitching plate and attempts to throw the ball past the batter to the catcher behind home plate. The throw, or pitch, must be made with an underhand motion.

The pitcher throws the ball in or around the "strike zone". However, in advanced play pitcher and catcher play a psychological game trying to get the batter to guess where the next pitch is going and if it will be a strike. In other instances, such as when an extremely powerful hitter comes up to bat and they are followed by a weaker hitter, a pitcher may deliberately walk the first batter based on the calculation that the next batter will be an easy out. The strike zone is slightly different in different forms of softball. A pitch that passes through that zone is a "strike". A pitch at which the batter swings is also a strike, as is any hit ball that lands in foul territory that is not caught out.

A pitch that is not a strike and at which the batter does not swing is known as a "ball". The number of balls and strikes is called the "count". The number of balls is always given first, as 2 and 1, 2 and 2, and so on. A count of 3 and 2 is a "full count" since the next ball or strike will end the batter's turn at the plate unless the ball goes foul.

==== Slow pitch ====
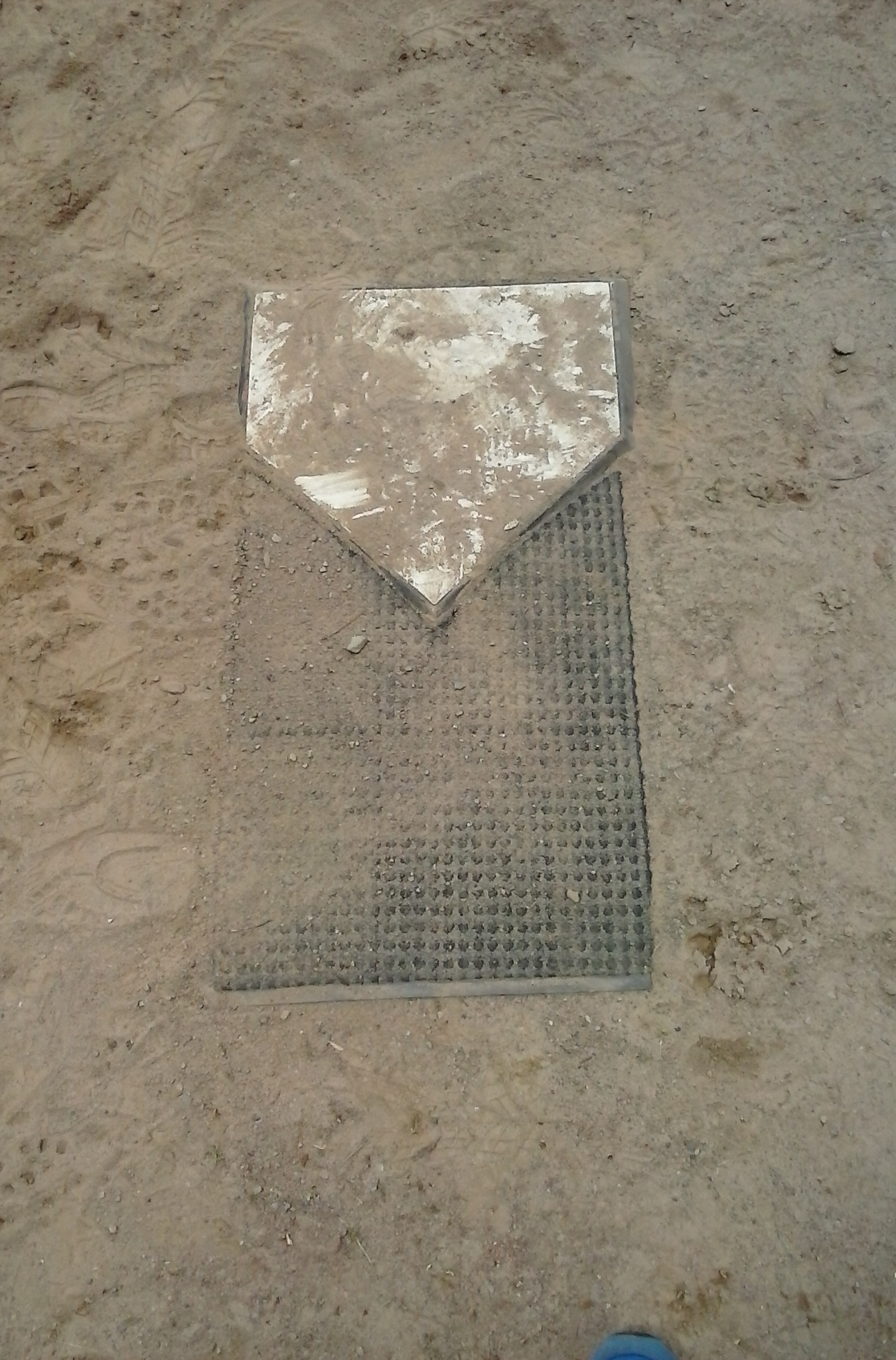
The target normally used in slow pitch softball. In some forms of slow pitch, the pitched ball must hit the black mat behind home plate to count as a strike.

In most versions of slow pitch (including 16-inch) the pitch is lobbed so that the ball rises above the batter's head and lands on a small rectangular area on the ground behind the plate called "the well". Umpires will make calls based on where the ball lands behind the plate; a pitch landing in the well is a strike. These restrictions make it much easier to put the ball into play and extremely difficult to use pitching as a defensive strategy, as the physics of projectile motion limit how fast a ball can be thrown under such conditions and still be called a strike. In other varieties of slow pitch (sometimes known as "modified"), the only restriction is that the windmill cannot be used; thus the pitching arm cannot be raised above the shoulder and both the wind-up and the release must be underhand, still allowing for moderate speed and control in pitching.

==== Fastpitch ====
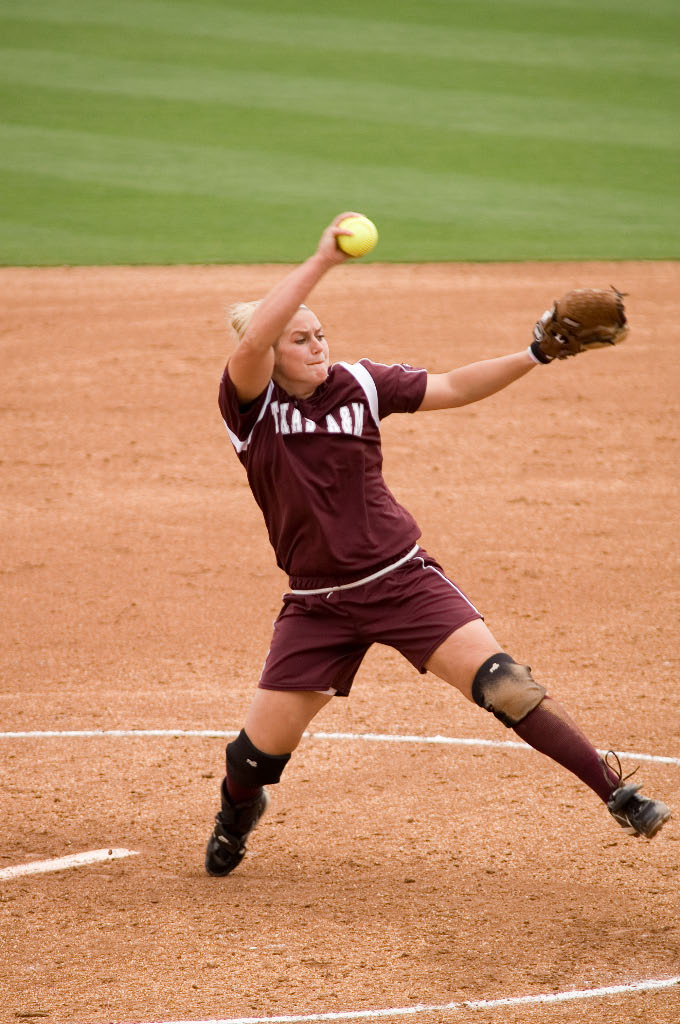
Fastpitch pitcher Megan Gibson pitching the ball in the "windmill" motion

For fastpitch softball, the traditional pitching style is a "windmill" motion, extending the arm above the body and releasing the ball at about hip level at maximum speeds. Strength acquired in the underhand windmill motion is based on the open-to-close hip motion.

Pitches may reach high speeds. In women's fastpitch, depending on the age group, pitchers can throw from 30 to 65 mph (48 to 105 km/h) or more. The fastest pitch ever recorded was at 79.4 mph (127.8 km/h) by Karlyn Pickens in May 2025 at the 2025 NCAA Division I softball tournament. At the 1996 Summer Olympics one pitch reached 73.3 mph (118.0 km/h). Male pitching can reach speeds around 85 mph (137 km/h). To compare, MLB players average around 90 mph (140 km/h) but can reach speeds up to 100 mph (160 km/h). Although slower than baseball pitches, the shorter pitching distance in fastpitch results in batters having a comparable time to react to a pitch as in baseball.

Throwing fastballs for speed is not always the most important factor in fastpitch softball. Pitchers can throw breaking balls that move late in their flight, fooling batters into swinging at pitches outside the strike zone or, conversely, not swinging at pitches that pass through the strike zone. These include balls that break inwards (screwball) and outwards (curveball) on right-handed batters, starting off the plate and moving into the strike zone or starting towards the strike zone and moving off the plate. There are also rise balls that break upwards, frequently starting in the strike zone and ending above it, and drop balls that break downward. Another common pitch is the change-up, an intentionally slow pitch that initially appears to be a fastball, causing the batter to swing too early and miss or foul off the pitch. Rarer is the knuckleball, which moves slowly and erratically. Pitchers use deception as a primary tactic for getting batters out as the reaction times are approximately half a second or less. At higher levels of play, pitchers aim for the inner and outer corners of the plate when throwing fastballs and breaking pitches. Pitchers also vary the location of the pitch by height to make hitting the ball even harder for the batter. Pitchers also throw knuckleballs which are generally slower and move erratically.

A "crow hop" is an illegal pitch that occurs when the pitcher pushes with the pivot foot from somewhere other than the pitching plate. This often involves jumping from the pitching plate and replanting somewhere in front of the pitching plate. For an illegal pitch, the umpire extends his left arm straight out to the side and clenches his fist. This results in a ball being awarded to the batter, and any runners on base advancing to the next base. If the batter swings at the pitch that is deemed illegal and puts the ball in play, the offense is given the option to accept the results of the play or accept the penalty listed previously (exception: if the play results in the batter and any runners all advancing at least one base, the play stands and no option is given). The image to the right demonstrates a legal pitch as the push-off foot has not left the ground. The ball must be released simultaneously with the lead leg step.

=== Batters ===
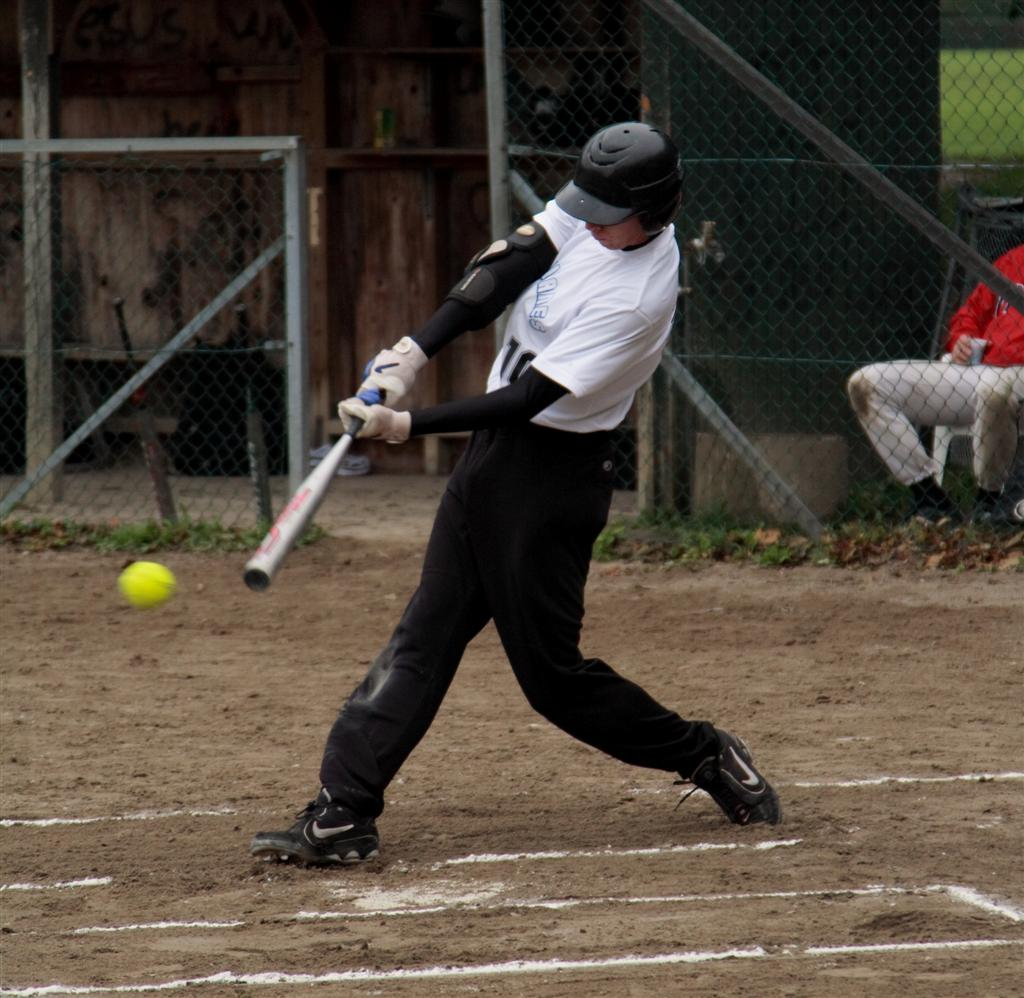
A batter swings at a pitch

The offensive team sends one "batter" at a time to home plate to use the bat to try to hit the pitch forward into fair territory. The order the players bat in, known as the "batting order", must stay the same throughout the game. Substitutes and replacements must bat in the same position as the player they are replacing. In co-ed, male and female batters must alternate.

The batter stands facing the pitcher inside a "batter's box" (there is one on each side of the plate to compensate for either right- or left-handed batters). The bat is held with both hands, over the shoulder, and away from the pitcher (90-degree angle). The ball is usually hit with a full swinging motion in which the bat may move through more than 360 degrees. The batter usually steps forward with the front foot, the body weight shifts forward, as the batter simultaneously swings the bat. A bunt is another form of batting. There are different types, including a sacrifice bunt, or slap bunt. There is also regular slapping in which a batter takes position on the left side of the plate and usually stands in the back of the box, but it is possible form anywhere. The batter takes a step back with their leading foot as the pitcher is in the middle of the windup, crosses over with their back foot and runs toward first base while they swing. There are many different types of slapping and they all vary depending on the batter and their strengths. There are half swing slaps, fake slaps, and full swing slaps. Each type of slap has a different purpose or goal. No matter what way the batter hits the ball, they must be inside the batter's box when the bat makes contact with the ball. If the batter steps out of the box while swinging, the batter is out.

Once the ball is hit into fair territory, the runner must try to advance to first base or beyond. While running to first base, the batter is a "batter-runner". When she safely reaches first (see below) she becomes a "base-runner" or "runner".

A batted ball hit high in the air is a "fly ball". A fly ball hit upward at an angle greater than 45 degrees is a "pop fly". A batted ball driven in the air through the infield at a height at which an infielder could play it if in the right position is a "line drive". A batted ball which hits the ground within the diamond is a "ground ball". If a batted ball hits a player or a base, it is considered to have hit the ground.

A batter can also advance to first if hit by the pitch. If a batter is hit by the pitch it is a dead ball and she is rewarded first base. The batter must make an attempt to get out of the way and it is the umpire's judgmental call whether the batter attempted to move. If the umpire feels the batter could have moved and avoided getting hit, the pitch will be recorded as a ball and the batter will not be awarded first base.

=== Getting the batter out ===
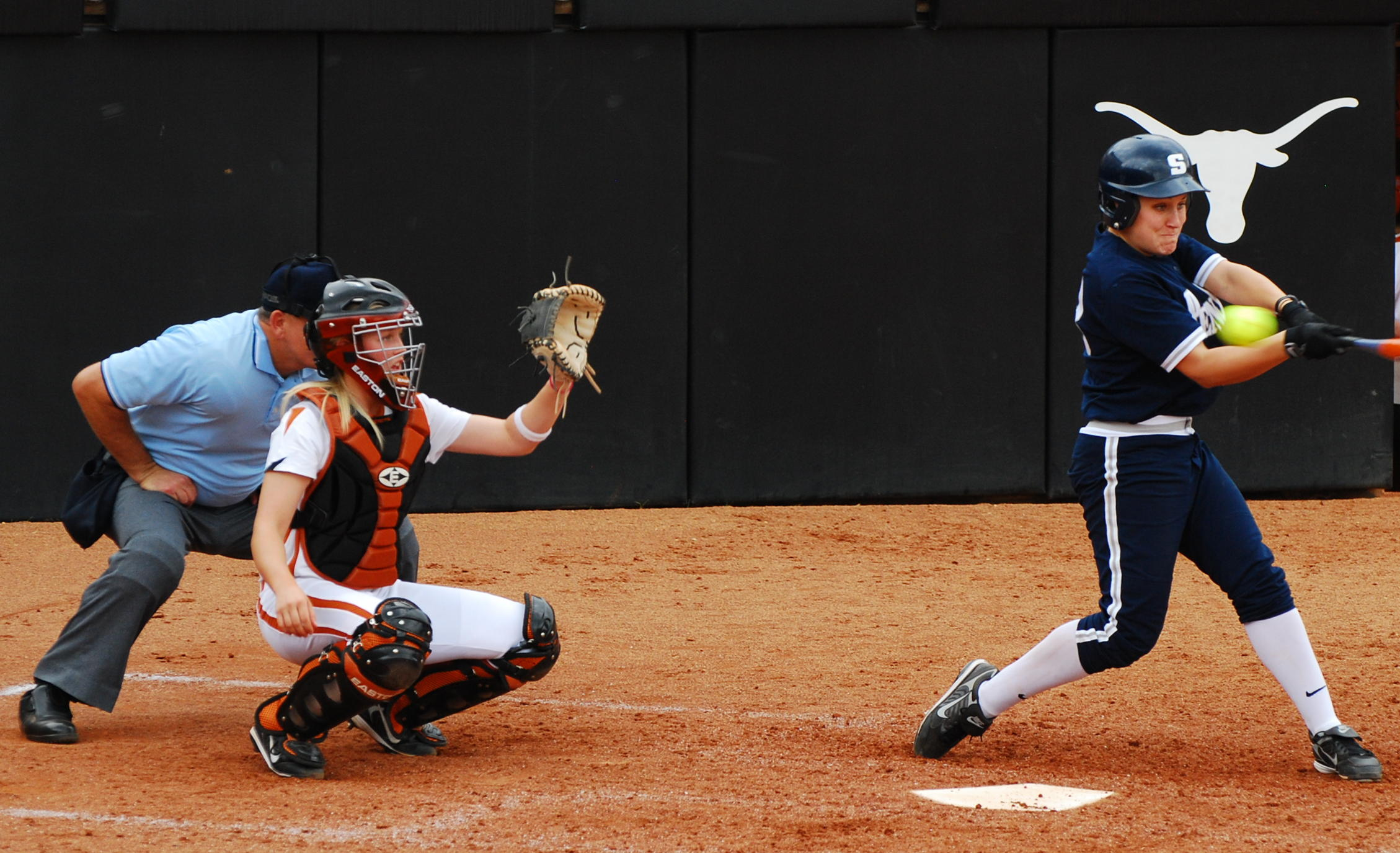
A batter striking out

The batter is out if: the batter accrues three strikes (a "strikeout"); a ball hit by the batter is caught before touching the ground (a "flyout"); the batter goes to a base that is already tagged ("tagged" or "tag play"); a fielder holding the ball touches a base which is the only base towards which the batter may run before the batter arrives there (a "force out" or "force play"); or in certain special circumstances. There is also a not so common occurrence when the batter has two strikes and swings at strike three. If the catcher does not catch the ball, the batter has the chance to run to first base and the catcher can throw the batter out at first base.

=== Advancing around the bases ===
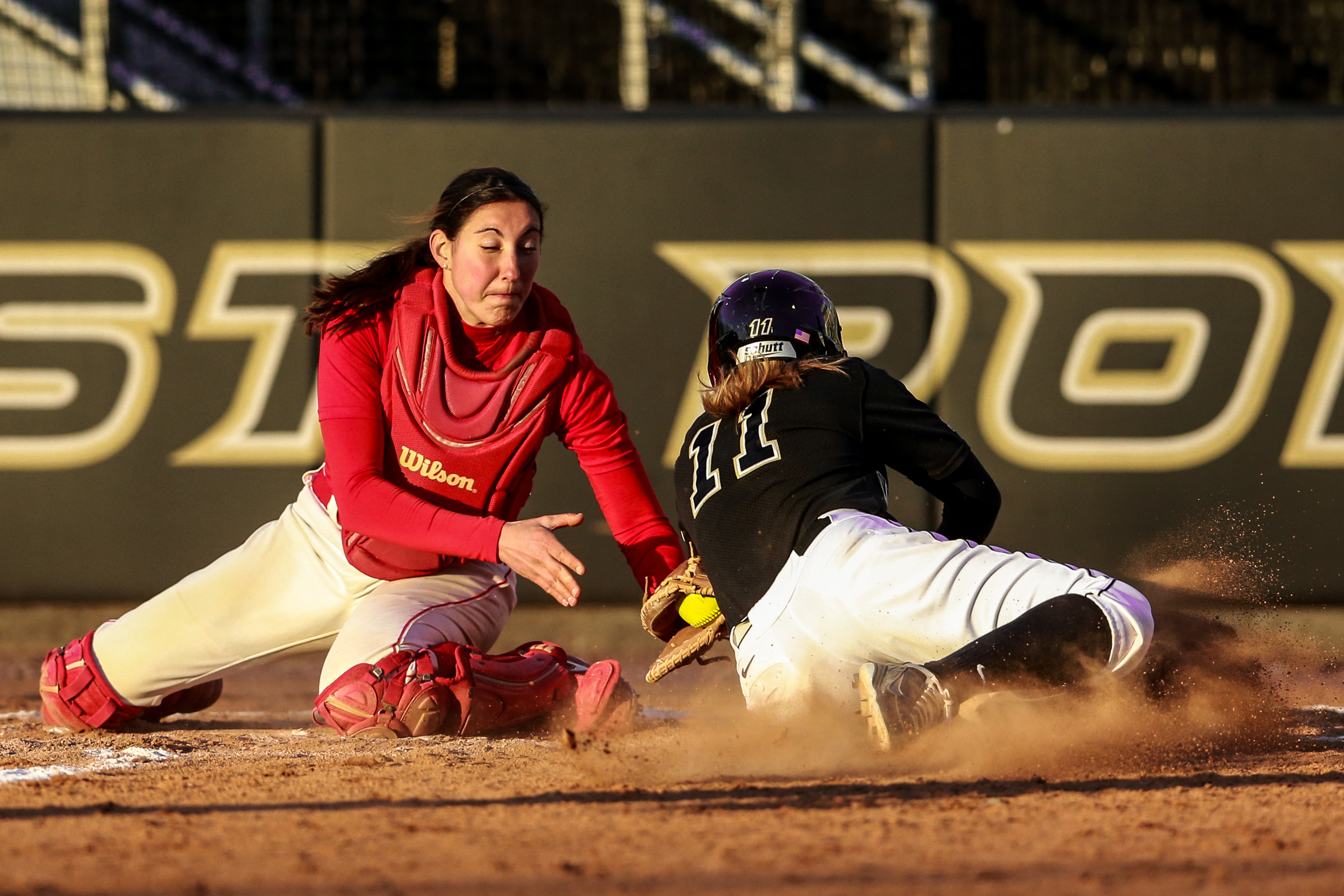
A baserunner attempting to slide into home plate is tagged out by the catcher.

If the player hits the ball and advances to a base without a fielding error or an out being recorded, then that is called a "base hit". The bases must be reached in order counterclockwise, starting with first base. After hitting the ball the batter may advance as many bases as possible. An advance to first base on the one hit is a "single", to second base is a "double", to third base is a "triple", and to home plate is a "home run". Home runs are usually scored by hitting the ball over the outfield fence, but may be scored on a hit which does not go over the fence. A home run includes any ball that bounces off a fielder and goes over the fence in fair-territory (depending upon association and local league rules) or that hits the foul pole. If a batted ball bounces off a fielder (in fair territory) and goes over the fence in foul territory, or if it goes over the fence at a location that is closer than the official distance, the batter is awarded a double instead.

If a runner becomes entitled to the base where another runner is standing, the latter runner must advance to the next base. For example, if a player hits the ball and there is a runner on first, the runner on first must try to advance to second because the batter-runner is entitled to first base. If the batter reaches first base without being put out, then that player can then be forced to run towards second base the next time a ball is driven into fair territory. That is because the player must vacate first base to allow the next batter to reach it, and consequently can only go to second base, where a force out may be recorded.

Runners may advance at risk to be put out: on a hit by another player; after a fly ball has been caught, provided the player was touching a base at the time the ball was first touched or after; or (in fastpitch) automatically, when a pitch is delivered illegally.

Runners advance without liability to be put out: when a walk advances another player to the runner's current base; or automatically in certain special circumstances described below.

In the recent years, the NCAA rules changed when concerning the batters feet while in the box. The rule now states that as long as any part of the batter's foot is in the box the ball will stay live. It is not until the batter's entire foot is out of the box, that the play will be declared dead and the batter called out. The SEC (college ball), however, claims that if any part of the batter's foot is out of the box when she makes contact, she is out and the play is dead.

==== Special circumstances ====
If there is a "wild throw" (or "overthrow") in which the ball goes out of the designated play area, each runner is awarded two bases from the last base touched at the time of the throw. Retreating past a made base, negates the advance to that base. If a fielder intentionally carries a ball out of play, two bases are awarded from the time the ball leaves the field of play. If this is unintentional (fielder's momentum), the award is one base. If on a tag play, the fielder loses control (after establishing control) of the ball and it leaves the field of play, one base is awarded.

If there is a "wild pitch" in which the ball goes out of the designated play area, each runner is awarded one base from the base occupied at the time of the pitch.

In fastpitch, runners may try to steal bases by running to the next base on the pitch and reaching it before being tagged with the ball. The point at which a runner can steal a base varies. In fastpitch, the runner is allowed to begin stealing a base when the ball is released from the "windmill" pitching motion, but until recently, stealing was forbidden in slow pitch because a runner has the opportunity to get a larger head start while the slow pitch is making its way to the batter. As a result of rule changes initiated by the Independent Softball Association which later made its way to the Amateur Softball Association and the International Softball Federation in the 21st century, most levels of slow pitch permit stealing bases, provided the runner starts when the ball either touches the ground or crosses the plate. This rule encourages pitchers to be more responsible with the pitch and catchers to play defense, as balls which miss the catcher are now grounds to have stolen bases.

No matter what level of play, all baserunners must keep one foot on a base until the pitcher throws the ball or until the ball crosses the front edge of home plate (depends on association).

In fastpitch, if the catcher drops strike three (a "passed ball") with no less than two outs, the batter can attempt to run to first base if first base is unoccupied. The catcher must then attempt to throw the ball to first base ahead of the runner, or the runner is safe. With two outs, the batter can attempt to run to first whether or not it is already occupied.

Depending on the league in slow pitch only a foul ball with two strikes on the batter means the batter is out. Stealing in 16-inch softball is severely restricted, as a runner may only steal the base in front of them if it is open, and if they are thrown at, à la pickoff move or snap throw. This results in many inexperienced players being thrown or doubled off when they attempt to advance on a wild pickoff at another baserunner.

=== Scoring runs ===
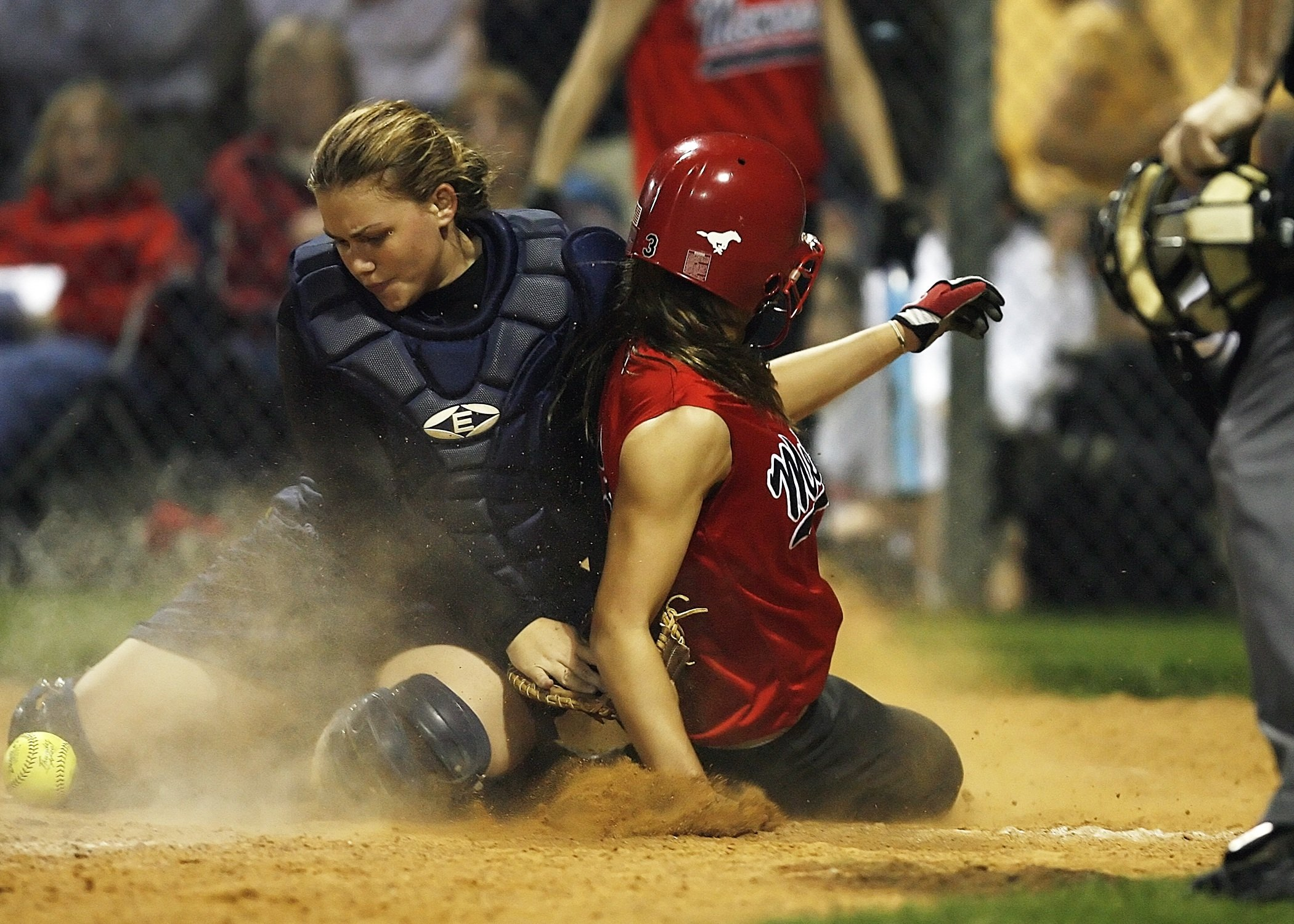
A collision at home plate — the player in red scores as the catcher has failed to secure the ball.

A "run" is scored when a player has touched all four bases in order, proceeding counterclockwise around them. They need not be touched on the same play; a batter may remain safely on a base while play proceeds and attempt to advance on a later play.

A run is not scored if the last out is a force out or occurs during the same play that the runner crosses home plate.

=== Ending the game ===
The team with the most runs after seven innings wins the game. The last (bottom) half of the seventh inning or any remaining part of the seventh inning is not played if the team batting second is leading.

If the game is tied, play usually continues until a decision is reached, by using the international tie-breaker rules. Starting in the top of first extra inning, the batting team starts with a baserunner on second base, which is the player who is the last available to bat (in other words, the batter who last took their position in the batter's box; regardless whether they were the last out or another runner was put out).

In games where one team leads by a large margin, the run ahead rule may come into play in order to reduce any potential embarrassment of weaker teams. In fastpitch and modified pitch, a margin of 15 runs after 3 innings, 10 after 4, or 7 after 5 is sufficient for the leading team to be declared the winner. In slow pitch, the margin is 20 runs after 4 innings or 15 after 5 innings. In the NCAA, the required margin after 5 innings is 8 runs. The mercy rule takes effect at the end of an inning. Thus, if the team batting first is ahead by enough runs for the rule to come into effect, the team batting second has their half of the inning to narrow the margin.

A game may be lost due to a "forfeit". A score of 7–0 for the team not at fault is recorded (generally one run is awarded for each inning that would have been played). A forfeit may be called due to any of these circumstances: if a team does not show up to play; if one side refuses to continue play; if a team fails to resume play after a suspension of play ends; if a team uses tactics intended to unfairly delay or hasten the game; if a player removed from the game does not leave within one minute of being instructed to do so; if a player that cannot play enters the game and one pitch has been thrown; if a team does not have, for whatever reason, enough players to continue; or if after warning by the umpire, a player continues to intentionally break the rules of the game. This last rule is rarely enforced as players who break rules after being warned are usually removed.

The plate umpire may suspend play because of darkness or anything that puts players or spectators in danger. If four innings have been played and a team is in the lead, the game is recorded as it stands. If fewer than four innings have been played, the game is not considered a "regulation" game. Games that are not regulation or are tied when suspended are resumed from the point of suspension. If it is a championship game, it is replayed from the beginning. Team rosters may be changed.

== Positions ==
Playing positions for fast pitch softball

There are nine players out on the field at one time in fastpitch softball and ten players in slow-pitch softball. Although the pitcher and catcher have the ball the most, each person has a specific job. In the infield there is the pitcher, catcher, first baseman, second baseman, shortstop, and third baseman. In the outfield there is a left fielder, center fielder, and right fielder. In slow-pitch softball there is an extra outfielder in the outfield, who is specified as a roamer or rover. Normally, the defensive team will play with four outfielders, meaning there is a left fielder, left-center fielder, right-center fielder, and right fielder. The recent trend with tournament and league slow pitch softball play is to field five infielders instead of four outfielders. The extra infielder is commonly placed behind the pitcher on either side of second base.

=== Pitcher ===
The pitcher is the individual who throws the ball from the middle of the diamond. As in baseball, fastpitch softball has a rubber used to control the pitcher's delivery. A pitcher must have both feet on the rubber at the start of their delivery but neither foot is on the rubber when the ball is released. In baseball, the rubber is on a mound of dirt as gravity is used to generate speed. In softball, the pitchers throw from within a circle and the rubber in the circle is not elevated. The circle is also used to control base runners. When the pitcher is in possession of the ball in the circle, a runner who has passed a base must either advance or return to the base. They cannot "bait" the pitcher to throw or they will be called out. The pitcher tries to throw the ball in the strike zone. In order to do that, they start while having the ball in their glove, they throw their arms behind their hips, they shoot forwards with their leg, which is on the same side as their glove, and leave their glove hand there and the other arm goes around the shoulder, bends the elbow, and turns their wrist toward the third baseman, and brings their arm through at the end, flicks their wrist, (which affects the ball's speed, spin and subsequent motion), and brings the arm up, with the hand by their shoulder. They follow through with their legs turning their pitching stance into a fielding stance. They try to release the ball when they go past their hips. In softball, the pitcher uses an underarm motion to pitch the ball towards the strike zone. As soon as the pitcher makes a throw, the fielders are ready to field balls that are hit in the middle of the diamond. Pitchers usually tend to be tall, very flexible and have good upper body strength. Pitchers can be righthanded or lefthanded. The softball pitcher makes a windmill motion while throwing underhand, unlike baseball pitchers who throw overhand.

=== Catcher ===
The catcher is normally behind home plate in a squatted position (some plays may require the catcher to stand at an angle for intentional walks). A catcher can also get in a position called "on a knee". This means that the catcher places one knee on the ground while the other is still up. This is done to offer the catcher a little rest while no one is on base, or can be used to offer a better angle for the umpire to see the pitch coming in. At the plate the catcher is responsible for catching pitches, keeping mis pitched balls in front of the plate, calling pitches that are normally done through hand signals, picking off runners, and they are considered the leaders of the field. Catchers must know how many outs there are, the number of strikes and balls on the batter so they can relay that to their teammates. They must also know how many runners are on base and where the ball should be thrown next in the following play. Catchers are strong, need to be smart and quick on their feet, and have accurate throws so they can pick runners off at each base. Catchers should be able to have strong and muscular legs to squat for a long period of time. Catchers must be quick thinkers and know the game better than most of their teammates.The gear worn by a catcher protects them from balls thrown in the dirt or wild pitches. The catcher is allowed to take off his/her mask to catch a pop fly or to watch the play.

=== First baseman ===
The first baseman is the position to the left side of the diamond when facing home plate. The major role of the first baseman is to receive throws from other defensive players in order to get a force play at first base. Another role they play is to make fielding plays on all balls hit towards first base. The first baseman is usually involved in every play that occurs on the field. Individuals at first base have quick hands and good reach and are always on the lookout to catch the player off base. They are also generally taller and left-handed throwing, which gives them an extended reach. First basemen, however, can be both left- and right-handed. Just like the catcher, first basemen may wear specific first base mitts, usually having a longer web allowing them to reach the taller throws over their head.

=== Second baseman ===
The second baseman plays in between the first baseman and second base itself, usually closer to second base. If the ball is hit to the left side of the field, the second baseman covers second base. If the ball is hit to right field or center field, they become the cut-off for the center fielder or the right fielder depending on who the ball was hit to. If the ball is hit to the first baseman, the second baseman then is responsible for covering first. If the ball is hit to the second baseman, they either throw the ball to second if there was already a player on first, or they throw to first if there was nobody on. If there is a runner on first and the person up to bat hits the ball to the shortstop or the third baseman, the second baseman is in charge of covering second to receive the throw from the shortstop or third baseman. Then, depending on where the runner is between home and first, the second baseman makes the decision to throw the ball to first or to hold the ball. Also, in the case of a bunt, the second baseman must cover first as the first baseman runs to get the ball from the bunt, then it is often thrown back to first base.

=== Shortstop ===
The shortstop fields all balls hit to the infield between the second and third bases. This individual also helps cover second and third bases, is frequently involved in force plays and double plays, and often throws the ball to the catcher to throw out runners at home plate. On steals to second base (when the runner from first is advancing to second on the pitch) the shortstop usually covers. The shortstop does not cover second base only when a right-handed batter is up. In this case, the second baseman covers the steal. Most shortstops are very quick, agile and think fast. Shortstops may play in a restricted zone but are faced with many types of hits and interact closely with the second base, third base and home plate. Often double plays are due to quick thinking/reaction by the shortstop. When a ball is hit up the middle and the shortstop catches it, they will flip the ball to the second baseman for the best result. Shortstop also takes the cut off for the left field when the play is at second base. When the ball is hit to the right side of the outfield, the shortstop then covers second base. If there is a runner on first base and there is a hit down the line or in the gap to right field, the shortstop will then go for the cut to third. Meaning the runner that is going from first to second will most likely be advancing to third, and in that case, the shortstop will be the cut off for the throw from right field to third base. Shortstop can be one of the most difficult positions to play due to the number of balls being hit in that direction.

=== Third baseman ===
The third baseman is the position on the right side of the diamond when you are facing home plate. They are responsible for fielding all balls hit their way including bunts. In fact, the third baseman fields more bunts than a pitcher and first baseman do. Third base is also called the "Hot Corner" because the ball can pop off the bat at the fielder very fast. Third baseman must have great reflexes and be very quick on their feet because not only to they need to be quick to field a bunt but also if they are unable to predict whether the batter will bunt or hit, a ball that is hit may be a line drive to the face. It also helps if they can run fast but it is not a requirement. A third baseman must have a very strong arm so that they can throw a runner out from across the diamond. Any ball that the third baseman can get, they should. They will have more momentum towards first base when fielding the ball than a shortstop. They are also closer to first base when they cut off a slower ground ball towards shortstop. Third baseman are responsible for covering third base at all times unless the ball is hit to them. In that instance, the shortstop is responsible for third base. Third baseman must be smart, have great reflexes, have a strong accurate arm, and be quick with their hands.

=== Outfielders ===
The outfielders are players that cover the grassy area behind the infield. Outfielders are named for their positions in the field relative to home plate. Traditional outfield positions include a left fielder, a center fielder, and a right fielder. Each player has a specific job as being an outfielder.

==== Right fielder ====
The right fielder's position is on the right side of the field, in the opening between the first and second basemen, when looking at the field from behind home plate. The right fielder is part of a group of two other fielders that make up the outfield. The right fielder has a multitude of jobs over the course of a softball game. Generally, outfielders act as a back-up to the infielders when they make plays or if the ball is hit past the infield. Right field has a particular job of covering the area behind first base if the ball is to be thrown in that area. Right field is meant to cover this area if the ball gets past the first baseman. This will prevent base-runners from advancing to unwanted bases. Traditionally in the game of softball, the right fielder will have the strongest arm out of the two other outfielders. The right fielder must have the strongest arm because they have the furthest possibility to throw the ball. A right fielder will throw the ball to each base more than the other outfielders will because of their position in respect to the bases.

==== Center fielder ====
The center fielder's position is in the middle of the outfield directly behind second base when looking at the field from behind home plate. The center fielder is part of a group of two other fielders that make up the outfield. Center fielders technically serve as the "captains" of the outfield. They are and should be the most vocal in effectively communicating with their outfielders. Since the outfielders are further apart from each other, it can be hard to hear each other. The center fielder covers the area behind second base if the ball is going to be thrown in that direction. By covering this area, if the ball does get past the infielder, the center fielder can prevent baserunners from advancing to unwanted bases. Within the game of softball, the center fielder is traditionally the fastest of the three outfielders. The center fielder needs to be the quickest because of the large area of field they must cover. Besides being a quick player, the center fielder must have a strong throwing arm because of the distance between the player and home plate.

==== Left fielder ====
The left fielder's position is on the left side of the outfield behind the third baseman when looking at the field from behind home plate. The left fielder is part of a group of two other fielders that make up the outfield. Generally, outfielders act as a back-up to the infielders when they make plays or if the ball is hit past the infield. The left fielder must field their position, but also cover the area behind third base if a ball is thrown or hit in that direction. The left fielder covers this area in the case that the ball will pass the infielders. The left fielder can then prevent the base runner from advancing to unwanted bases. Besides covering certain areas of the field, the left fielder must be the smartest of the outfielders. In the left field position, the player has full view of the field, the players, the baserunners, and the batter. The left fielder must constantly be aware of the situation on the field and know what must be done in different circumstances. More advanced levels require the left fielder to be able to field the ball during "slap hit" situations by playing shallow. Left fielders must also play a role in any run-down situation between third base and home plate or back up any plays that happen at third base in case of an overthrow.

=== Designated player ===
In fastpitch softball, it is common for teams to use a designated player in the lineup; this player, which functions like the designated hitter in baseball, hits in place of one of the position players but does not play defense.

Unlike a designated hitter, a designated player can also become a temporary defensive substitute, and the player substituted by the designated player can return to their original position at a later point in the game. However, the only player that can be substituted as an offensive replacement (pinch runner or pinch hitter) is the defensive player the designated player originally replaced, known as the "flex".

At any time, the designated player can be substituted back into the lineup in the place of the flex player, but once taken out, the designated player cannot take the place of any other player in the lineup.

==== Short fielder ====
In some leagues and organizations, four outfield players are utilized by each team. The extra outfielder is sometimes called the short fielder and plays somewhere behind second base, adjusting position based on the handedness or other characteristics of the batter, while the regular center fielder plays a considerably deeper position. The short fielder used as such can take away a batting strategy in softball, which is to hit soft liners over the pitcher.

However, some teams prefer to use the fourth outfielder like the others, with the center field position being shared between two players known as the left-center fielder and the right-center fielder. In this case the four outfielders are spaced equidistantly and play at roughly the same depth.

== Pitch ==
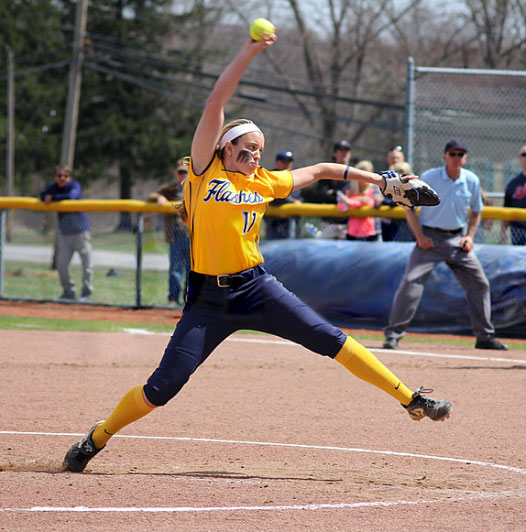
Unlike in baseball, softball pitches are thrown in an underhand style.

In softball, a pitch is the act of throwing a softball toward home plate to start a play. All pitches are thrown from below the waist in an underhand motion. The phases of throwing include the grip, stance, windup, stride, release and follow through.

Pitchers throw a variety of pitches, each of which has a slightly different velocity, trajectory, movement, hand position, wrist position and/or arm angle. These variations are introduced to confuse the batter in various ways, and ultimately aid the defensive team in getting the batter or base runners out. To obtain variety, and therefore enhance defensive baseball strategy, the pitcher manipulates the grip on the ball at the point of release. Variations in the grip cause the seams to "catch" the air differently, thereby changing the trajectory of the ball, making it harder for the batter to hit.

The selection of which pitch to use can depend on a wide variety of factors including the type of hitter who is being faced; whether there are any base runners; how many outs have been made in the inning; and the current score.

=== Signaling ===
The responsibility for selecting the type of pitch is traditionally made by the catcher by relaying hand signals to the pitcher with the fingers. In more advanced play, coaches may give signs to batters and/or runners to initiate special plays in certain situations. A catcher may signal to a position player that they will be trying to throw the runner out. A runner on base may see the pitch sign given by the catcher and hint it to the batter using hand or body motions.

=== Pitching styles ===
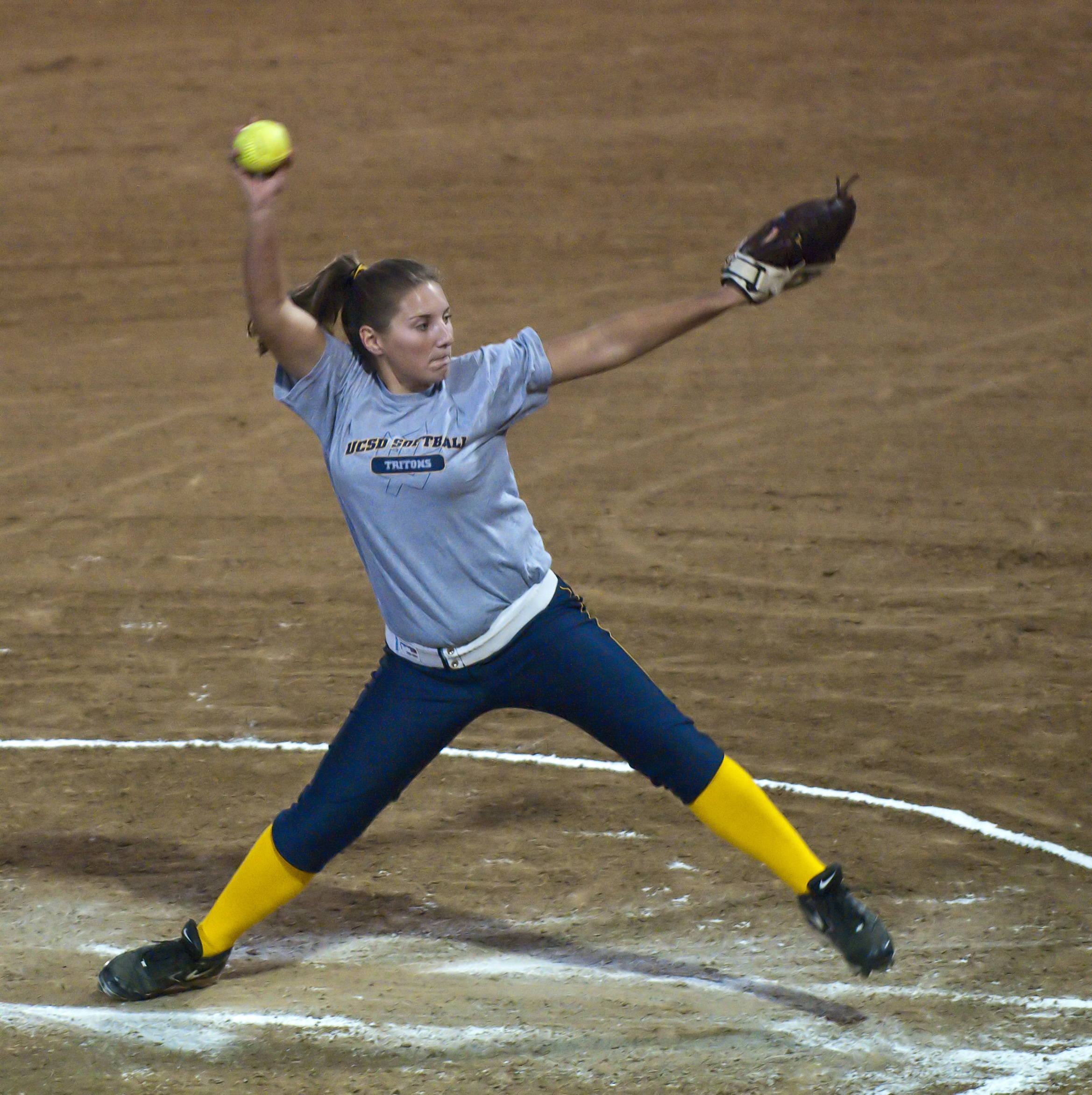
Pitching in softball involves various styles.

The World Baseball Softball Confederation (WBSC) recognizes three pitching styles:

- fastpitch
- "modified" fastpitch
- slow-pitch

==== Fastpitch style ====
The pitching distance can range between 35 feet for younger players and 43 feet for older players. Collegiate and international level pitchers pitch from 43 feet. Pitches can travel at speeds of more than 65 mph (105 km/h).

- Windmill or "Full-windmill"

- The pitcher begins with her arm at the hip. Then she brings the ball in a circular motion over the head, completes the circle back down at the hip, and snaps the hand.

- Figure 8

- The ball is not brought over the head at all but down and behind the body and back in one smooth motion tracing out a figure eight.

- Illegal forms of pitching
  - "crow-hopping"
  - "leaping"

Leaping is now legal in College softball. A pitcher can now have both feet in the air at the dame time when they are delivering the pitch. As long as a pitcher is not replanting and pushing of the ground a second time, the leap is legal.

==== "Modified" fastpitch style ====
- "Modified" windmill

- A "modified" fastpitch is identical to a "windmill" pitch except the arm is not brought over the head in a full windmill motion, but instead is brought behind the body (restricted back swing) and is then thrust directly forward for the release.

==== Slow-pitch style ====
The pitching distance is 50 feet. The pitch must be lofted in such a way that it falls onto the plate in order for it to be a called strike (the ball falls into the strike-zone instead of flying through). Strikeouts are rare in slow-pitch. Pitchers strategize to pitch the ball with a high enough arc that the batter cannot hit a line-drive. The speed of the pitches ranges from 25 to 35 mph (40 to 56 km/h), resulting in plenty of reaction time.

- half windmill

- High-arc pitching technique
- The pitch must be thrown with an arc between 6-12 feet high. If the arc is not high enough, the umpire will call the pitch illegal.

=== Types of pitches ===
==== Fastballs ====
The fastball is typically the first type of pitch a player will learn.

- Two-seam fastball
- Four-seam fastball

==== Breaking balls ====
- Drop ball
- Riseball
- Curveball
- Screwball
- Drop-curve
- Rise-curve
- Backdoor curve (the pitch starts out of the strike zone and curves back over the plate. Often, this pitch is thrown at a batters hip or hands with the intention of either moving them off the plate or inducing a foul ball)
- Drop screw
- Backdoor screw (the same as a backdoor curve except the ball spins in the opposite direction of a curveball)
- Drop curve

==== Changeups ====
The changeup is the staple off-speed pitch, usually thrown to look like a fastball but arriving much slower to the plate. Its reduced speed coupled with its deceptive delivery is meant to confuse the batter's timing. There are a variety of grips and techniques a pitcher may use to deliver a change up such as:

- Flip (or "Back-hand flip") release
- Stiff wrist release
- Circle grip changeup
- Knuckle grip changeup

===== Other off-speed pitches =====
- Knuckle curveball
- Floater

- This is a pitch used by pitchers in the slow-pitch game. To throw the floater accurately, pitcher holds the ball with just his or her fingertips and does not let them touch the laces. Then comes straight up with her hand and lets the ball go up to the 12-foot mark and come down.

- Knuckleball

== Recreational play ==
=== Types of leagues ===
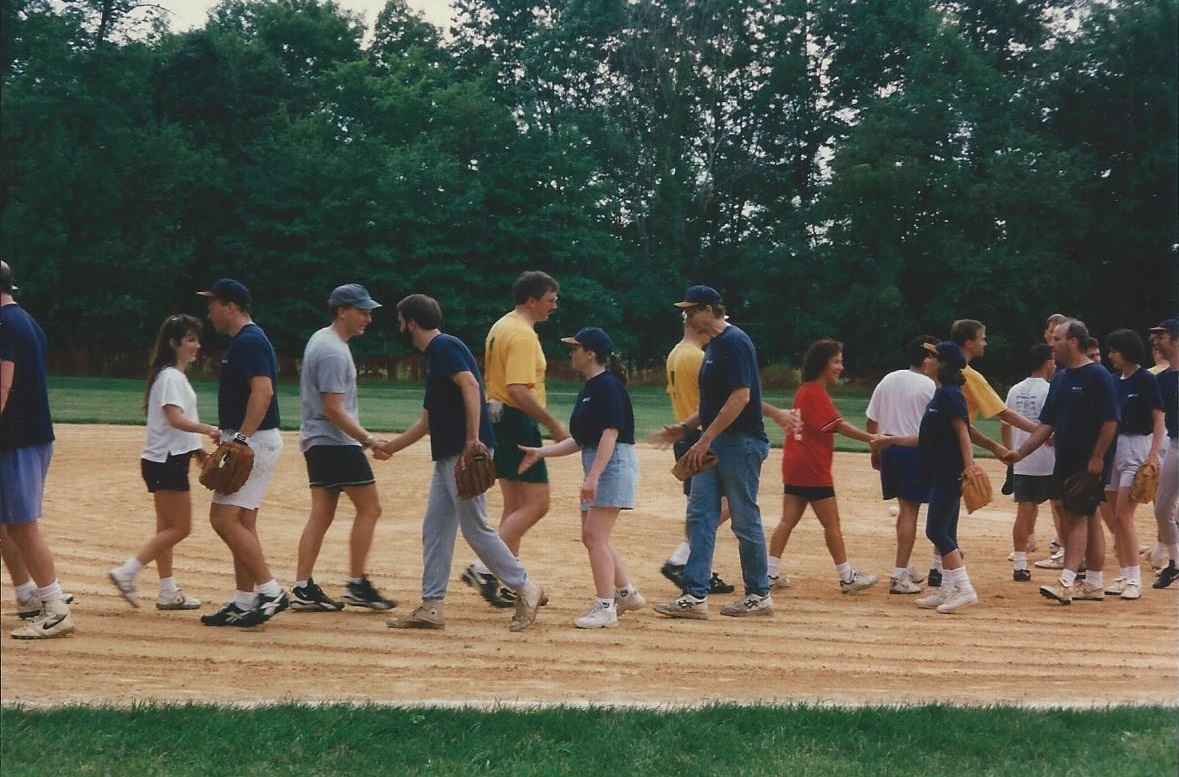
Handshakes at the conclusion of a championship game in a co-ed recreational league, as seen in New Jersey in 1997.

It is estimated that 14.62 million Americans played at least one game of softball during the spring of 2015. It is played by men and women both recreationally and competitively.

Softball is especially popular as a recreational activity for adults. Leagues for such play are often characterized as either "fun leagues", in which the outdoor exercise and player camaraderie is more important than the final result, or "serious leagues". The distinction is not absolute and there can be gradations within each. Softball teams are often organized around groups of employees who play in the early evening after work in the summer. In many US cities, adult softball teams are organized by bars and clubs, hence the popular term "beer league" softball. The teams can be men's, women's or co-ed, and skill levels can range from novice to elite, with league composition reflecting that. These leagues are typically either slow-pitch or modified.

Co-ed recreational leagues, where men and women play on the same team, generally have provisions to keep men from dominating the game. League rules may stipulate that there must be an equal number of men and women on the team, or that batting order alternate male and female batters. Some leagues only require three women to play but they must be present on the field at all times. Others will allow a game to proceed when a team does not have the requisite number of women available but charge the batting team with an automatic out whenever the missing woman's place in the batting order comes up.

=== Modification of rules ===
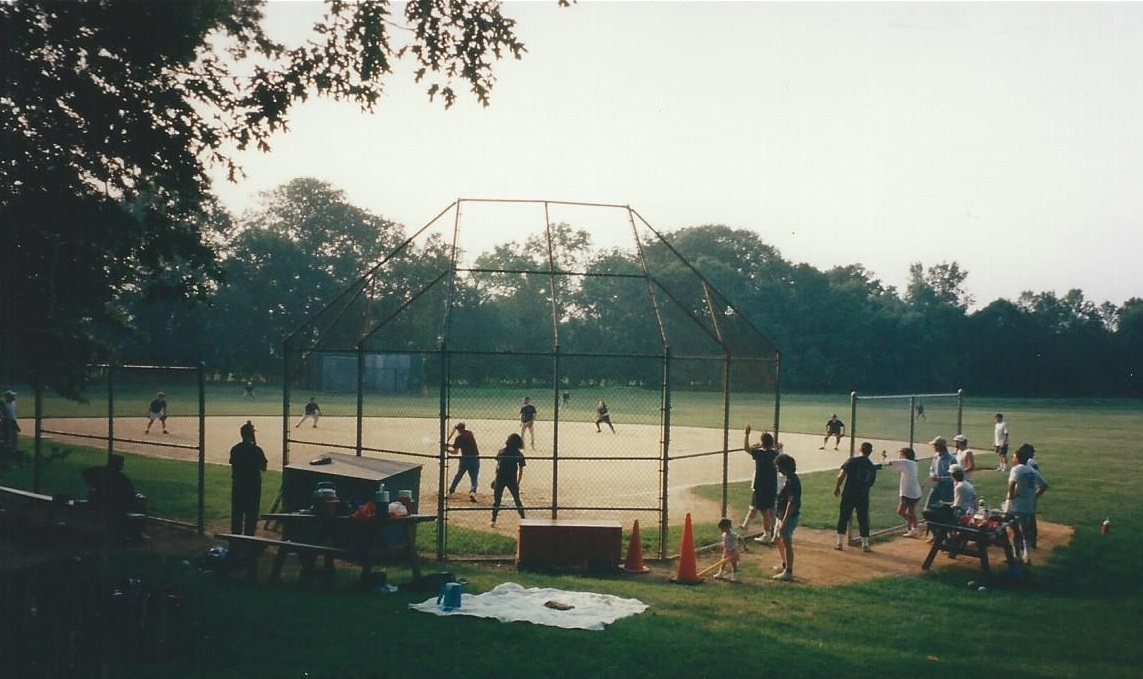
Recreational game in progress, New Jersey, 1996

One reason for the popularity of softball is the ease of modification of its rules, thereby allowing the game to be adapted to a variety of skill levels. For example, in some slow pitch softball leagues a batter starts at bat with a count of one ball one strike. In some leagues, the number of home runs that can be hit by a team are limited. In other leagues, stealing of bases is prohibited. Some groups allow for a more defensive game by making home plate a force out for first base. This reduces scoring evenly on both sides, and allows for some margin of error.

Co-ed leagues sometimes adopt live-play rules intended to reduce gender inequality, under the assumption that men will be generally more powerful. In most co-ed or mixed gender leagues there is something called an encroachment line. This requires the outfielders to stay behind a line till the ball is hit. If an outfielder passes in front of this line before the female batter hits a fair ball, the batter will receive a single base or the result of the play, and the base runners will advance accordingly. The line will be 180 feet from home plate. One possible rule requires male batters to "switch hit". Some leagues even use different balls for male and female batters. While these modified rules are common, there are questions as to their place in modern adult sports.

Some leagues require teams to use limited flight softballs. These softballs, when hit, will not go as far as regular softballs. Other leagues limit the number of runs which can be scored in an inning. Five is a common limit.

By allowing these and other modifications, softball can be enjoyed by children, teenagers, and adults. Senior leagues with players over the age of 60 are not uncommon.

An example of a rule modification is the "offensive pitcher" (or "self pitch") often found in informal games where the emphasis is on the social rather than the competitive aspects of the game. The pitcher aids the batter by attempting to give the easiest pitch to hit. There are no walks, and a batter is normally given a fixed number of pitches to attempt to hit (usually 3 or 4). The batter is considered to strike out if the batter fails to hit the ball into fair territory after the given number of pitches. The pitcher does not act as a fielder, and a rule is often made that if a batted ball touches the pitcher, the batter is out.

In some leagues the number of pitches to walk or strikeout can be reduced. For instance, one strike is an out, and two balls is a walk. This is common in leagues where doubleheaders are played, or in late season leagues when reduced daylight is an issue. It results in shorter games, as players are more apt to swing, even at marginal pitches, rather than risk striking out on one pitch.

Many leagues also include a second first base immediately adjacent to the main one. This is usually orange and the batter running through first base is supposed to run straight through it. This minimizes the chances of a collision. By the same token some leagues have an alternate home plate and rule that plays at home are always force plays. In these cases there is typically a white line drawn approximately 1/3 of the way down the baseline that is considered a point of no return. This is designed to reduce the "Pickle" which can put a great strain on the ankles and knees of older baserunners.

=== Indoor play ===
Despite the fact that it was originally intended to be played indoors, softball is usually played outdoors. The indoor form is sometimes called Arena Softball. Indoor softball has generally the same rules as outdoor softball. Only the wall behind the batter is considered foul territory. The other walls are considered fair. Usually, there is a small area on one of the walls in the outfield that results in a home run being awarded if the batted ball hits it. Pitching is generally a little slower because of the indoor turf, or pitched through a pitching machine at younger levels. There is no limit to the number of batters a team may have available, although only so many can bat in one inning. Some indoor facilities do not allow the use of metal cleats on the field, which are what players at the age of 14 and up generally use. Also, some tournaments may require a time limit for games.

== Professional leagues ==
There have been many professional women's softball leagues in the United States in recent decades. In 2026, the two primary leagues are Athletes Unlimited Softball League (AUSL) and Professional Softball League (PSL). These two leagues came from the remnants of Women's Professional Fastpitch (WPF, 2022–2024), a league formed after COVID. Prior to that, National Pro Fastpitch (NPF) operated from 2002 until ceasing operations in 2021 due to the COVID-19 pandemic. NPF was a follow-up to Women's Pro Softball League (WPSL, 1997–2001).

The Athletes Unlimited Softball League began play in 2025, having received investment from Major League Baseball that year. The inaugural season featured 4 teams, and it expanded to 6, each adopting a permanent home city, in 2026. In 2026, the Milwaukee Brewers announced they were investing directly in the AUSL, making them the first Major League Baseball Club to do so.

The late 1970s to early 1980s marked a brief era for men's professional softball in the United States.

== International competition ==
Softball is played in over a hundred countries around the world. The highest governing body for the sport, the World Baseball Softball Confederation (WBSC), has 190 member countries (excluding dependent territories). The WBSC holds world championships in several categories.

USA Softball is the National Governing Body of Softball for the United States pursuant to the 1976 Amateur Sports Act. Due to the popularity of the sport, there are a multitude of governing bodies such as the United States Specialty Sports Association, International Softball Congress and the National Softball Association.

The WBSC holds the Women's Softball World Cup tournaments in several categories. The tournament in each category is held every four years—two years from 2010. The most recent tournament was XII Women's World Championship in June, 2010. All World Championships use a Page playoff system and are in fastpitch. There are also several World Cups held at 4-year intervals in different categories.

New Zealand became the Men's World Champions winning the world title in 2013. Prior to that, Australia won the World Championship in 2009 and New Zealand had won the previous three tournaments before that.

In the Junior Men's World Champions in 2012, Team Argentina won the world title.

=== Summer Olympics ===
In the Women's Softball World Cup the United States is the most dominant team, having won three of the past four Olympic tournaments and the past seven World Championships. The current Junior Women's World Champion is the United States.

Women's softball debuted at the 1996 Summer Olympics and was removed from the program following the 2008 Summer Olympics. Softball and Baseball were unable to have their sport included in the program at the 2012 and 2016 Summer Olympics. In 2012 the heads of the International Softball and Baseball Federations announced their united effort to be included in the program in 2020. "The proposal calls for men's baseball and women's softball to be played at a single venue during 7 to 10 days. Each tournament would feature eight teams. Baseball and softball would be two disciplines under a single sports banner. The proposal awaits formal endorsement from the congress of both federations. Other sports which sought to be included in the 2020 program, when only one spot is up for filling, were: karate, roller sports, squash, sports climbing, wakeboard and wushu. The IOC executive board were to decide at their May meeting which sport to recommend for inclusion. The final decision was made in a vote of the full IOC in Buenos Aires in September 2013. Softball and Baseball were re-included in the Summer Olympic Games in Tokyo 2020, which was held in 2021. The American team had entered the gold medal match with an undefeated record, facing Japan. United States was defeated 2–0 by Japan, naming Japan the Tokyo 2020 Softball Olympic Gold Medalists.

Softball was not included in the 2024 Summer Olympics but is expected to return for the 2028 Summer Olympics.

Even though the 2028 Summer Olympics will be held in LA, the softball and baseball events will be held in Oklahoma.

=== Participating countries and areas ===
==== New Zealand ====
New Zealand is the most successful nation at men's world championship softball, having won their eighth title in 2019. The New Zealand women's team have also won a number of World Championship titles in the past. The game is widely played in New Zealand and is the second most popular summer sport behind cricket.

The women's team won the fifth International Softball Federation world championship in 1982, defeating Chinese Taipei in the final.

==== Australia ====
Softball is played in all states and territories in Australia and at all levels of academic education. The game is promoted to maintain fitness, health, personal achievements and pleasure.

==== Japan ====
Japan has had a long tradition of softball which is played at all levels in the country. Many high schools and colleges have sports programs which include softball. Like baseball, softball in Japan is intensely competitive. Japan's win over the United States at the 2008 Olympics reflects the advanced level of play in Japan.

==== China ====
Since the silver medal at the Atlanta Olympics, the Chinese have now made softball a priority at all levels.

==== Europe ====
Softball is played in almost every country in Europe, mainly fastpitch. Every two years an open women's European fastpitch championship is held with over twenty nationals teams. Italy and Netherlands are the best nations, and both have an almost professional championship where athletes from the US, Australia and China play. In the men's division eight to ten national teams compete for the European championship, with the Czech Republic, the Netherlands and Denmark leading the way.

==== United States ====
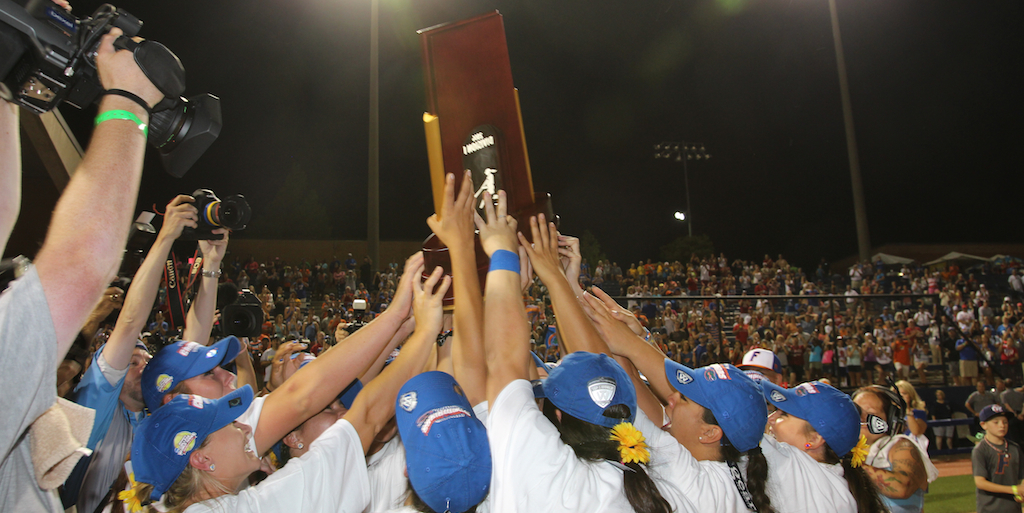
2014 Women's College World Series Championship Series

In America, there are more than 1,500 college softball teams spanning five different levels: NCAA Division 1, Division 2, Division 3, NAIA, and NJCAA. There are 5 professional softball teams: the Aussie Peppers, the Chicago Bandits, the Cleveland Comets, the California Commotion, and the Canadian Wild.

Competitive fastpitch softball is growing increasingly popular, with an estimated 2.5 million players in the US as of 2024, up from 2.3 million the year prior, with 69.9% of participants being female. All over the US, there are thousands of teams that compete year-round at tournaments. During most of these tournaments the biggest goal is not winning the tournament, but attempting to get as many college coaches as possible to observe (a) particular player or players. Competitive teams are now beginning around eight years old, if not younger. Depending on the team they can travel all over the United States or even out of the country such as to Canada, the summer and fall for many weeks and days at a time.

The World Baseball Softball Confederation (WBSC) regulates rules of play in more than 110 countries, including the United States and Canada; before the WBSC was formed in 2013, the International Softball Federation (ISF) filled this role. Its affiliated US Softball (founded in 1933 as Amateur Softball Association) is known as the national governing body of softball in the United States, one of the largest governing bodies for the game in that country with over 240,000 teams, and sponsors annual sectional and World Series championships. The United States also has a competitive women's softball team that competes in international tournaments. They represented the US each time at the Olympics until softball was removed from the Olympics. The USA Softball Men's Fast Pitch National Team has won five World Championships (1966, 1968, 1976, 1980 and 1988) and three other medals. In the Pan-American Games, Team USA has made the finals in all seven appearances at the Games when Men's Fast Pitch was played.

Other national and regional sanctioning bodies also exist, including: NCAA, NFHS, USSSA, ISA, NSA, WSL, USFA, Triple Crown and SASL just to name a few. The USSSA, founded in 1968 as the United States Slo-Pitch Softball Association, but renamed in 1997 to the United States Specialty Sports Association, is the only association that still has a men's major slow-pitch program alive. Currently, the USSSA program is run out of Viera, FL.

== See also ==
- Women's Professional Fastpitch, the main professional women's softball league in the United States
- Softball Australia, the governing body of softball in Australia
- Comparison of baseball and softball
- 16-inch softball
- Rounders – a similar game from which baseball and softball are thought to have evolved
- Stoolball – a similar game from which baseball and softball are thought to have evolved
- Tee-ball – a reformed version of baseball
- Baseball5 – an international variant of softball involving only a rubber ball
- Dartball – a game of darts that uses rules similar to softball and is played on a large dartboard that resembles a softball field
- Safe haven games
- Men's Professional Softball Leagues
- Eddie Feigner
- Pekin Lettes, the oldest member-sanctioned ASA softball team in the United States
- Softball in Ireland
- European Softball Federation
- NCAA Division I softball championship
