= Mohawk =

Mohawk may refer to:

== Related to Native Americans ==
- Mohawk people (Kanien’kehá:ka), an Indigenous people of North America (Canada and New York)
- Mohawk language (Kanien’kéha), the language spoken by the Mohawk people
- Mohawk hairstyle, from a hairstyle once thought to have been traditionally worn by the Mohawk people
- Mohawk people (Oregon), a band of the Kalapuya Native American tribe in the U.S. state of Oregon

== Places ==
=== Communities ===
- Mohawk, Arizona
- Mohawk, California
- Mohawk, Indiana
- Mohawk, Herkimer County, New York
- Mohawk, Montgomery County, New York
- Mohawk, Oregon
- Mohawk, Tennessee
- Mohawk, Virginia

=== Lakes, rivers and waterfalls ===
- Lake Mohawk (Ohio)
- Mohawk River (disambiguation)
- Mohawk Falls, one of the waterfalls in Ricketts Glen State Park in Pennsylvania

=== Other ===
United States

- Mohawk Dam, Jefferson Township, Ohio
- Mohawk Mountains, in southwestern Arizona
- Mohawk State Forest, in Connecticut
- Mohawk Valley, the area surrounding the Mohawk River in New York
- Mohawk Valley (Arizona)

Canada

- Mohawk Island, Ontario, Canada

== Ships ==
- USS Mohawk, three US Navy ships, as well as Coast Guard and Revenue cutters and a navy reserve tug
- HMS Mohawk, thirteen ships of the Royal Navy
- Mohawk, a wooden steamboat once known as the Inland Flyer

== Aircraft ==
- Curtiss P-36 Hawk, an American fighter aircraft called the Mohawk in British service
- Grumman OV-1 Mohawk military observation aircraft
- Las Brisas Mohawk, an American homebuilt aircraft design
- Miles Mohawk, 1930s British monoplane

== In business ==
- Mohawk Airlines, a defunct airline
- Mohawk Productions, Inc., a television company
- Mohawk Gasoline, a gasoline station company in Canada owned by Husky Energy
- Mohawk Innovative Technology, a product and research and development technology company
- Mohawk Mall, a defunct mall in Niskayuna, New York
- Mohawk Commons (Niskayuna, New York), the retail center that replaced Mohawk Mall
- Mohawk Industries, a flooring manufacturer based in Calhoun, Georgia, United States
- Mohawk Data Sciences Corporation, a defunct computer company

== In the arts ==
- Mohawk (1956 film), a 1956 western
- Mohawk (2017 film), a 2017 thriller set during The War of 1812
- Mohawk (1986 novel), a 1986 novel by Richard Russo
- Essra Mohawk (born 1947), American singer-songwriter
- Frazier Mohawk (born 1941), American record producer and husband of Essra Mohawk
- The Mohawks, a band fronted by composer Alan Hawkshaw
- Mohawk, a jazz tune composed by Charlie Parker appearing on the 1950 album Bird & Diz

== In transportation ==
- Mohawk Subdivision, a railroad line in New York
- NYC Mohawk, the 4-8-2 steam locomotive wheel arrangement
- Mohawk, one of the Sunbeam side-valve aircraft engines
- the Mohawk (GTW train), a named passenger train of the Grand Trunk Western Railroad
- the Mohawk (NYC train), a named passenger train of the New York Central Railroad

== Roads and raceways ==
- Mohawk Raceway, Campbellville, Ontario, Canada
- Mohawk Road (Hamilton, Ontario)
- Mohawk Trail, a Native American trade route, now part of Massachusetts Route 2

== Other uses ==
- Mohawk, the name of a 1956 Operation Redwing nuclear test
- Mohawk Area School District, a school system in Pennsylvania
- Mohawk College, a college in Hamilton, Ontario
- Mohawk Chapel, the oldest church in Ontario
- Mohawk Sports Park, Hamilton, Ontario
- Mohawk turn in figure skating
- Mohawk (crater), an impact crater in the Elysium quadrangle of Mars

== See also ==
- Mohocks, an early eighteenth-century London gang
