= Sports in Hamilton, Ontario =

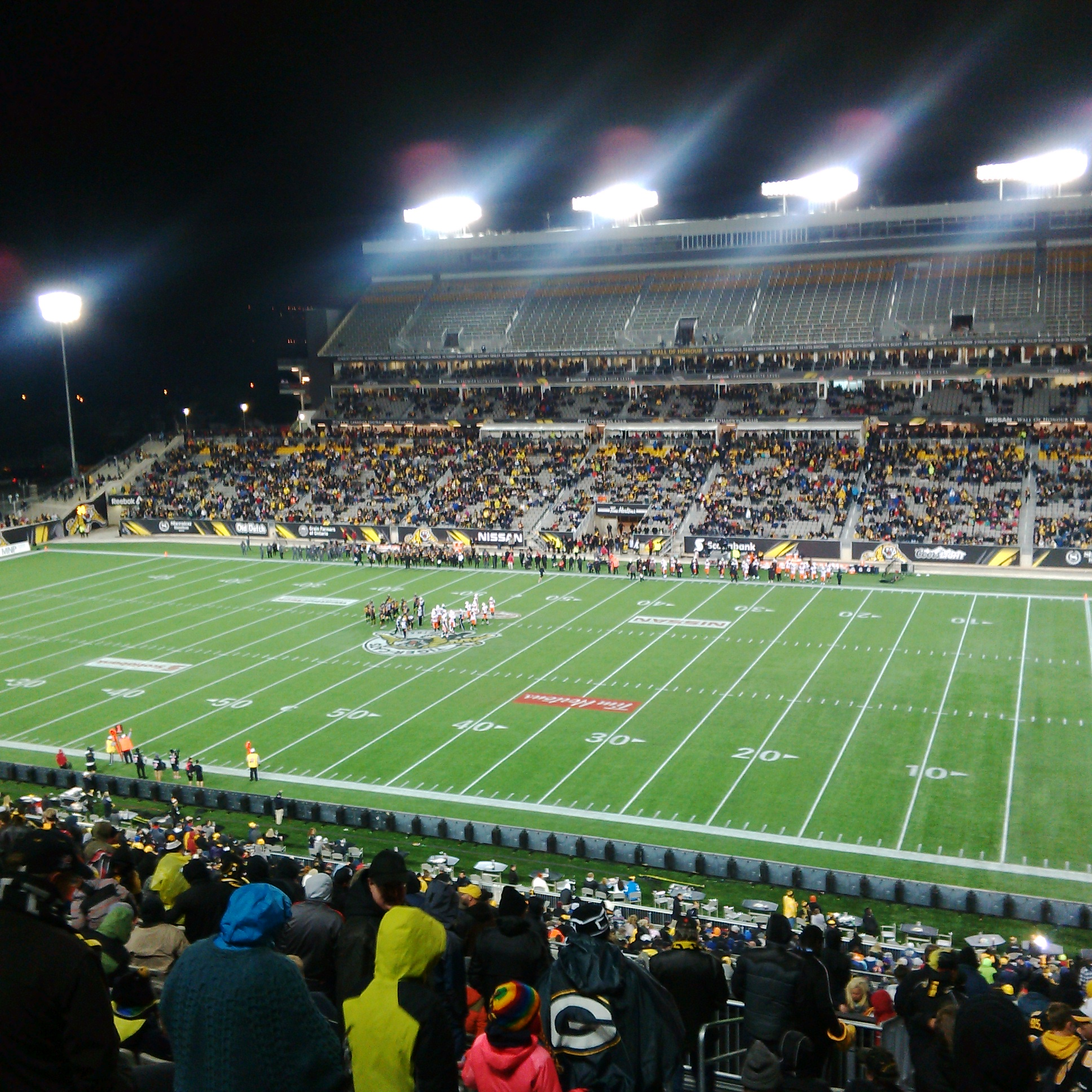
Canadian Football in Hamilton

Sports in Hamilton is an important part of the city's history and culture. In 1930, Hamilton, Ontario, Canada was the site of the very first Commonwealth Games, then known as the British Empire Games. The Games came to Hamilton as a result of the efforts of Melville Marks Robinson, and were Canada's first major international athletic event, and bid unsuccessfully for the Commonwealth Games in 2010, losing out to New Delhi in India. In 2009, it was announced that Toronto will host the 2015 Pan Am Games and the city of Hamilton will be co-hosting the Games with Toronto. The city attempted to become Canada's host city for the 1976 Summer Olympics, placing third behind Toronto and winner Montreal. Hamilton also previously attempted to host the 1954 British Empire and Commonwealth Games and the 1983 Pan American Games.

The Around the Bay Road Race circumnavigates Hamilton Harbour or Burlington Bay. Although it is not a proper marathon, it is the longest continuously held long distance foot race in North America, held in Hamilton since 1894, 3-years before the Boston Marathon. The local newspaper, Hamilton Spectator has also hosted the amateur Spectator Indoor Games. Hamilton has also produced a number of prominent runners over the years. Some of these include, Robert Kerr, (1882–1963), was an Irish-Canadian sprinter. He won the gold medal in the 200 metres and the bronze medal in the 100 metres at the 1908 Summer Olympics, Ray Lewis, (1910–2003), Track & Field, first Canadian-born Black Olympic medallist and William Sherring, (1878–1964), was a Canadian athlete, winner of the marathon race at the 1906 Summer Olympics.

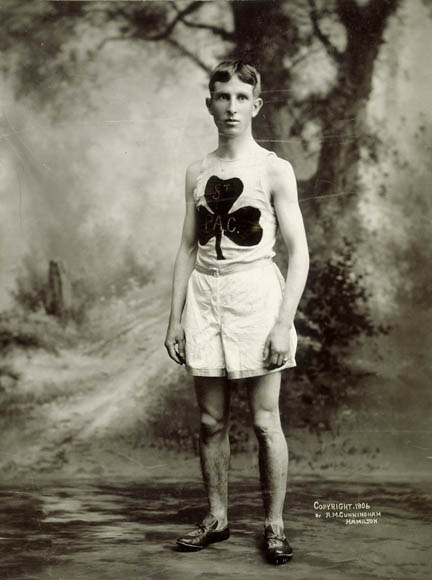
William Sherring, winner of marathon race at 1906 Summer Olympics

Other noteworthy Olympians, Commonwealth Games and Pan American Games participants from Hamilton include; Lisa Buscombe, Archer, won the women's World Field archery Championship title in 1984 and in 1985 won the World Games Field Archery Title. Inducted into the Canadian Amateur Sports Hall of Fame in 1985. In 1999 coached silver Canadian medallist in Men's Archery at the Pan Am Games; Toller Cranston, (1949–2015 ), Canadian Figure skater- Bronze medal 1976 Winter Games; Bryce Davison, (1986– ), Canadian figure skater, competes in the pairs event with Jessica Dubé. Member of the Hamilton Skating Club; Ray Lazdins, (1964– ), a retired discus thrower from Canada, who represented his native country twice at the Summer Olympics; Irene MacDonald, (1931–2002), Diving, she reigned as Canada's champion diver from 1951 to 1961. She won medals at the 1954 and 1958 Commonwealth Games and in 1956 she won Canada's first Olympic diving medal, a bronze; Joanne Malar, (1975– ), Former freestyle and medley swimmer, who competed in three consecutive Summer Olympics; Pat Messner, (1954– ), Water skiing, 1972 Summer Olympics Bronze medal winner; Linda Thom, (1943– ), Woman's shooting (25m Pistol) Gold at 1984 Summer Olympics; and Tonya Verbeek, silver medallist at the 2004 Summer Olympics in women's wrestling in the 55 kg category – Canada's first woman to medal at the Olympics in wrestling. At the 2008 Summer Olympics, she won Canada's third medal overall, and third Canadian medal ever in women's wrestling, by winning a bronze in the 55kg class. In the year 2000 Hamilton was the first city in the western hemisphere to ever host the International Children's Games. Over 2500 athletes from 35 countries and 5 continents participated in the largest sporting and cultural celebration in games history. The games opened on 1 July, Canada Birthday hosting a large cultural festival parade and opening ceremonies broadcast across Canada. The games were considered Canada's premier millennium event and the event left an international legacy where as now over 100 countries and almost a thousand cities worldwide have participated in this international sporting event recognized by the IOC. Hamilton successfully hosted the World Cycling Championships in 2003. It was only the fourth time the World Cycling Championships was staged in North America, and the second time ever in Canada (Montreal 1974.) Igor Astarloa of Spain was the winner.

The Hamilton Golf and Country Club has hosted the Canadian Open golf championship four times, most recently in 2003 when Bob Tway won and again in 2006 with Jim Furyk the winner. The traditional course layout, designed by famed course architect Harry Colt, proved very popular with touring pros. Florence Harvey, (1878–1968), Hamilton golfer, was the Ontario Ladies Amateur Champion 1904, 1906, 1913, and 1914 and the Canadian Ladies Champion in 1903 and 1904. She founded and served on the executive of the Canadian Ladies Golf Association and is a member of Canada's Golf Hall of Fame.

Hamilton has hosted the Brier, the Canadian men's curling championship, a total of 3 times, in 1949, 1991 and the 2007 Tim Hortons Brier.

Hamilton is twinned with Flint, Michigan, and its amateur athletes compete in the CANUSA Games, held alternatively there and here since 1958. Flint and Hamilton hold the distinction of having the oldest continuous sister-city relationship between a U.S. and Canadian city, since 1957. Hamilton hosted the games' 50th-anniversary in 2007. Special events included the 30th annual golf tournament at King's Forest. The tournament was dedicated to the memory of well-known Hamilton broadcaster and longtime CANUSA volunteer Bill Sturrup.

== Sports venues ==
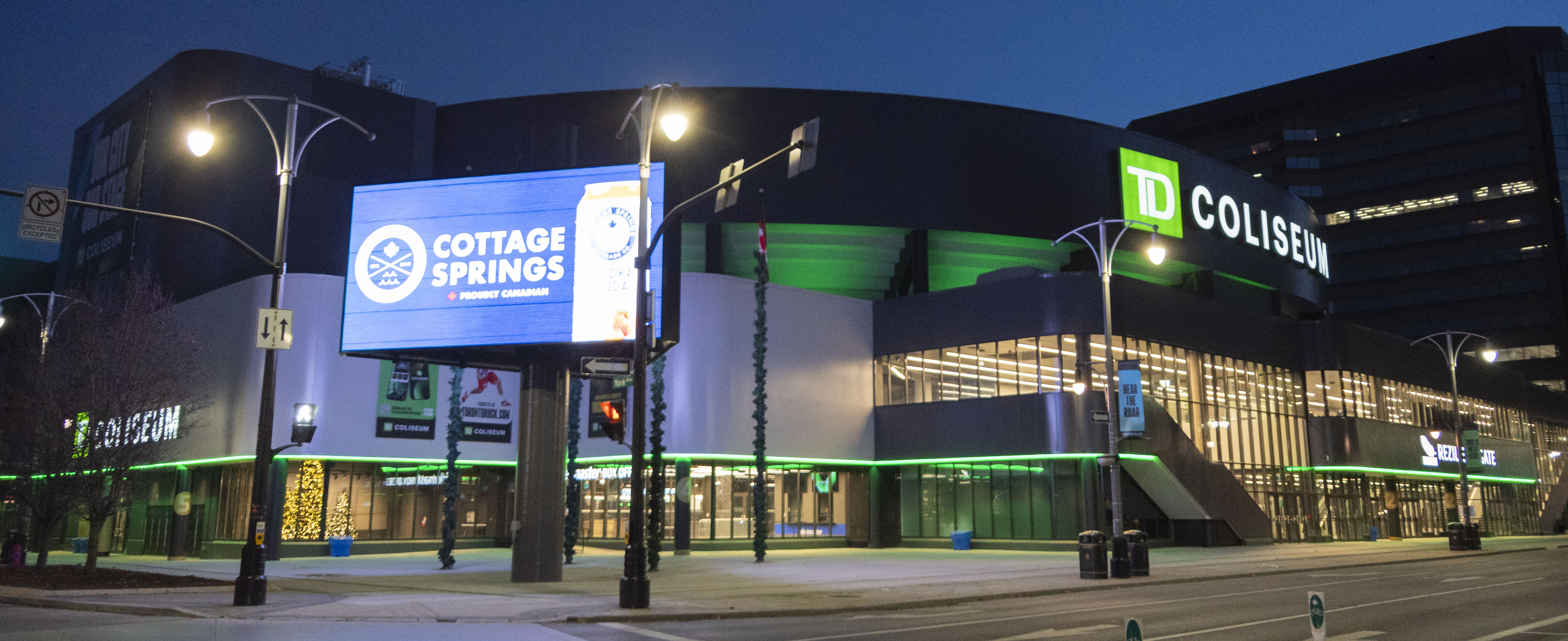
TD Coliseum, looking east on York Boulevard

Two new sports venues opened up in Hamilton, Ontario in 2007–08, both of which are on the McMaster University grounds. The first is the $23-million Ron Joyce Stadium, and the second is the $30-million David Braley Athletic Centre.

The 6,000-seat Ronald V. Joyce Stadium is primarily a football stadium with officials at McMaster University suggesting it may be the best soccer venue in the Golden Horseshoe after Toronto's BMO Field, and it has taken steps to try to position the stadium for extensive soccer use. Extensive renovations were also done to the gym at the Ivor Wynne Centre. Total cost of the upgrades was $54-million. University officials have also noted that previous successful Pan Am and Commonwealth Games in Winnipeg, Victoria and Edmonton have utilized university facilities. Mac officials are also aiming to make the university one of the athlete villages.

== Innovations ==
Ron Foxcroft is the owner of Fox 40 International who make 40,000 whistles/ day. Used by search and rescue professionals in major catastrophes like the San Francisco earthquake and Oklahoma City bombing, and collapse of the World Trade Center. Also used by Major League sports officials around the world like the NHL, NBA, NFL including the Summer Olympics and Winter Olympics.

Kenesky Sports on Barton & Wellington Streets is the site where Emil Kenesky (Emil "Pops" Kenesky) invented the hockey goalie pads in 1917. His new pads were cricket pads, modified, and widened to approximately 12 inches. The new pads caught on extremely quickly, and this style of pad was used by a majority of pro goalies right on to the 1970s. Hockey Hall of Famers like Johnny Bower, Jacques Plante and Terry Sawchuk having worn them. Kenesky's company became the best-known manufacturer of hockey equipment in Canada. Kenesky Sports also has a hockey school for goalies of all-ages. Alumni include NHL netminders Ray Emery and Dwayne Roloson.

Charlie O'Brien, a former major league baseball catcher, after getting smashed in his mask by two consecutive foul-tip balls in a game, O'Brien had the idea for a new catcher's mask (a helmet, actually) while he was watching a hockey game. He worked with Van Velden Mask Inc., of Stoney Creek, Hamilton, Ontario, Canada, to develop his idea. The new design, called the All-Star MVP, was approved in 1996 by Major League Baseball. The company is a maker of hockey goalie masks and equipment and was named after the owner of the company, Gerry Van Velden.

== Professional Sports Teams ==
Professional teams
Club	League	Venue	Championships	Established
Hamilton Tiger-Cats	Canadian Football League	Hamilton Stadium	8 (15 in total)	1950 (older in 1869)
Forge FC	Canadian Premier League/CONCACAF Champions Cup	Hamilton Stadium	4 (8 in total)	2017
Hamilton Hammers	American Hockey League	TD Coliseum	0	2026
Toronto Rock	National Lacrosse League	TD Coliseum	6 (16 in total)	1998
Hamilton Havoc	Professional Women's Hockey League	TD Coliseum	0	2026

== Amateur, junior, professional, and semi-professional teams ==
Other professional teams
Club	League	Venue	Established	Championships
Hammer City Roller Derby	Women’s Flat Track Derby Association	Coronation Arena	0	None
Stoney Creek Sabres	Ontario Women’s Hockey Association	Gateway Ice Centre	0	None
Hamilton Cardinals	Canadian Baseball League	Bernie Arbour Memorial Stadium	1	WBSC Americas
Hamilton Hurricanes	Canadian Junior Football League	Hamilton Stadium	0	None
Hamilton Bengals	Ontario Junior B Lacrosse League	Dave Andreychuk Arena		None
Chantilly Forever FC	United Premier Soccer League	Sackville Memorial Park Stadium	6	CONCACAF
Chantilly Forever BC	Hamilton Youth Basketball / Local Development House Leagues	R.A. Riddell School	2	None
Hamilton City SC	Canadian Soccer League	Heritage Field	0	Non-FIFA
Hamilton Croatia	Hamilton & District Premier Soccer League's Elite Division	Croatian Sports and Community Centre of Hamilton	1	None
Hamilton Hornets R.F.C.	Niagara Rugby Union	Mohawk Sports Park	0	None
Hamilton Kilty B's	Greater Ontario Junior Hockey League	Dave Andreychuk Mountain Arena	0	None
Hamilton Steelhawks	Allan Cup Hockey	Andreychuk Mountain Arena	0	None
Hamilton United	Premier Soccer Leagues Canada	Ron Joyce Stadium	0	Canadian Championship
Hamilton Wildcats	AFL Canada	Mohawk Sports Park	0	None
Stoney Creek Camels R.F.C.	Niagara Rugby Union	Saltfleet District High School	1	None
Stoney Creek Generals	Allan Cup Hockey	Gateway Ice Centre	2	None
Sigma FC	Premier Soccer Leagues Canada	Paramount Fine Foods Centre/Hamilton Stadium	0	CONCACAF
CS Mont-Royal Outremont	Premier Soccer Leagues Canada	REC Mont-Royal	0	Canadian Championship

Hamilton Select

Hamilton Select is a fast pitch league containing teams from across the city. It is a league for the ages of 19 and under. It is a relatively unknown league to the public, but is highly scouted. It is a very competitive league that has each park trying to be regarded as Hamilton's finest team. Hamilton select consists of 28 teams in the Hamilton region but East Hamilton is where the top teams are found. The league originated in 1997. The team to win earns an entry into Regionals to play against Niagara's, Ottawa's, and Toronto's top teams. There has only been one team to win Regionals representing Hamilton: Gage Park 1999. Over the past 12 years there have only been 6 different teams to represent Hamilton: Gage Park (5), Rosedale (3), Scott Park (2), Roxborough (1), and Berrisfield (1).

== Canadian football ==
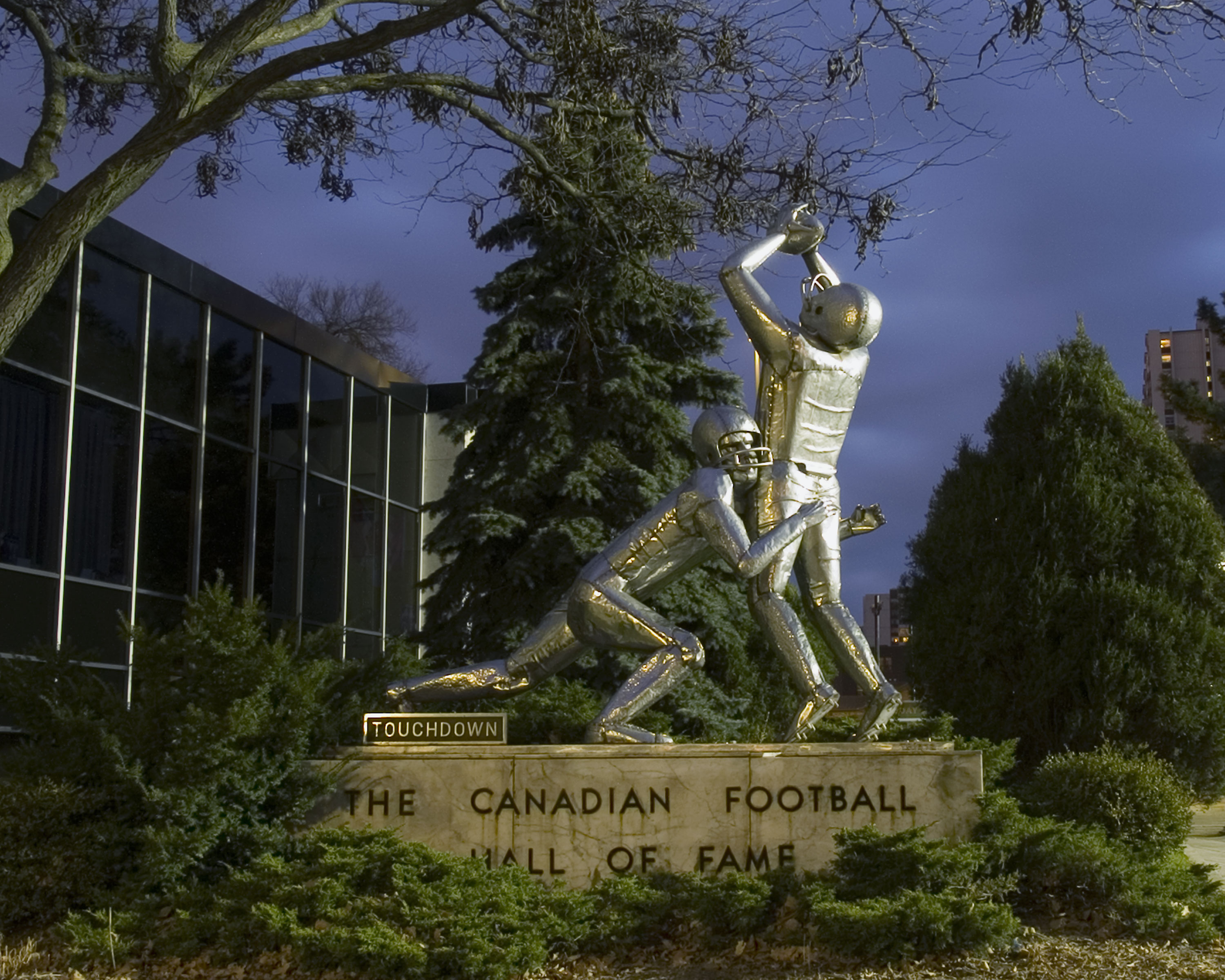
The Canadian Football Hall of Fame museum

Hamilton is also home to the Canadian Football Hall of Fame museum. The museum hosts an annual induction event in a week-long celebration that includes school visits, a golf tournament, a formal induction dinner and concludes with the Hall of Fame game involving the local CFL Hamilton Tiger-Cats at Ivor Wynne Stadium.

On Wednesday, 3 November 1869, in a room above George Lee's Fruit Store, the Hamilton Football Club was formed. The club was first referred to as the Hamilton Tigers in their first game against the Toronto Argonauts in which Hamilton wore black and yellow for the first time, hence the nickname "Tigers." Hamilton Football Clubs have captured the Grey Cup in every decade of the 20th century, a feat matched by only one other franchise in the North American Major Leagues, the Rochester Red Wings. In 1908, the Tigers won the "Dominion Championship", a year before the Grey Cup was presented. The only time that football was interrupted in Hamilton as a spectator sport was during the First and Second World Wars. After World War II the Hamilton Tigers Football Team started competition once again. During WWII, a new group in the City had been formed and they became known as the Hamilton Wildcats. The competition for fan participation was so great that both teams were unable to operate on a sound financial basis. It was decided that the two Clubs should amalgamate and form one representative team for Hamilton. The present name, Tiger-Cats, and what is known as the modern era of football started in 1950.

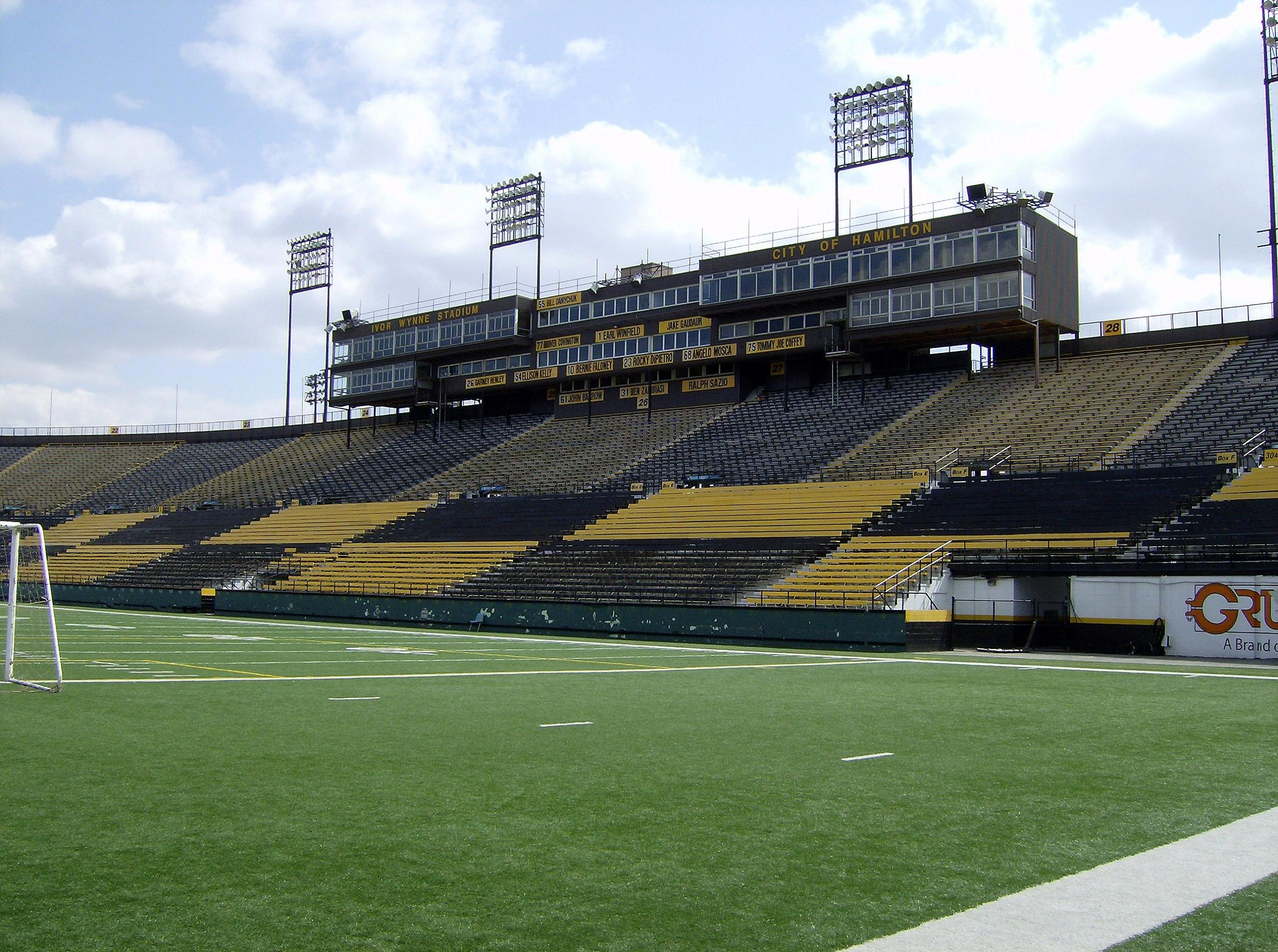
Ivor Wynne Stadium

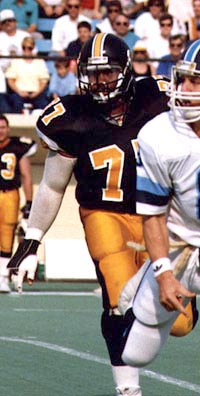
Grover Covington

Hamilton based football teams have captured the Grey Cup a total of 15-times, which is second best among Canadian cities (Toronto teams have won 21-times). The Hamilton Tiger-Cats have won eight, the Hamilton Tigers have won five and the Hamilton Flying Wildcats and the Hamilton Alerts each won once. The Hamilton Alerts were the first team from Hamilton to win the Grey Cup back in 1912 against the Toronto Argonauts in Hamilton at the old A.A.A. Grounds. The city of Hamilton has hosted the Grey Cup Finals a total of 10-times, the last one being in 1996 (84th Grey Cup) in the "Snow Bowl" where the Toronto Argonauts defeated the Edmonton Eskimos by a score of 43–37. This was also the only Grey Cup game in Hamilton that did not feature a Hamilton-based team.

Ivor Wynne Stadium is the home of the Hamilton Tiger-Cats. The stadium originally known as Civic Stadium was constructed in 1930 to host the 1930 British Empire Games; Canada's first major international athletic event, held in Hamilton from 16 to 23 August 1930. Notable residents and former players include "King Kong" Angelo Mosca.

The CFL's annual Eastern Division Labour Day Classic pits the Hamilton Tiger-Cats against perennial rivals the Toronto Argonauts. This particular weekend, typically the tenth or eleventh week in the season, is known for its fixtures that do not change from year to year. Oddly, for many years before his death, Harold Ballard owned both the Hamilton Tiger-Cats and the Toronto Maple Leafs, the National Hockey League (NHL) franchise in rival city Toronto. The team's prowess has fallen dramatically from its glory days in the 1960s and early 1970s, when it was a powerhouse.

Hamilton and area pro football players and personalities over the years include;

- John Bonk (1950– ), was an all star offensive lineman in the Canadian Football League. The four-time All-Star played from 1973 to 1985 for the Winnipeg Blue Bombers.
- Less Browne (1959– ), was a CFL defensive back for Hamilton, Winnipeg, Ottawa and B.C. He holds the CFL and all-pro records for most interceptions in a career with 87. Resides in Hamilton.
- Henry Waszczuk (1950- ), was an all star center for Hamilton. The seven-time All Star played from 1975 to 1984. As a Ti-Cat, Henry was awarded the Tom Pate Memorial Award for his contribution to the team, his community and the league. He also was chosen as the Rothman’s Outstanding Lineman on three occasions and was also nominated for the Schenley Awards three times. Henry was also selected to the all-time Hamilton Tiger Cat “Dream Team”.
- Bob Cameron (1954– ), Played 23 seasons (1980–2002) with the Winnipeg Blue Bombers of the Canadian Football League.
- Steve Christie (1967– ), ex-placekicker in the NFL, who holds a Super Bowl record for longest field goal kicked at 54 yards.
- Tommy Joe Coffey, was a Canadian Football League receiver who played for the Hamilton Tiger-Cats. Currently resides in Burlington, Ontario.
- Peter Dalla Riva (1946– ), a former professional Canadian football player with the Montreal Alouettes of the Canadian Football League at the tight end and wide receiver positions. 3-time CFL Allstar.
- Bernie Faloney (1932–1999), was a star quarterback football player in the United States and Canada.
- Tony Gabriel (1948– ), Canadian Football Pass Receiver; inducted into Canadian Football Hall of Fame in 1985 (from Burlington ON).
- Corey Grant (1976– ), former wide receiver for the Saskatchewan Roughriders and Hamilton Tiger-Cats of the Canadian Football League. (Stoney Creek, Ontario)
- Russ Jackson (1936– ), Canadian Football quarterback, all-time pass leading Canadian quarterback, 3 Grey Cups with the Ottawa Rough Riders.
- Joe Krol (1919–2008 ), Canadian Football quarterback (1932–53), Lou Marsh Trophy winner as Canada's top athlete in 1946.
- Ron Lancaster (1938–2008), Former football player, coach and general manager in the Canadian Football League (CFL) and sports announcer for CBC Television.
- Jesse Lumsden (1982– ), former running back with Hamilton, Edmonton, and Calgary of the Canadian Football League and McMaster University alumnus.
- Mike Morreale (1971– ), award-winning receiver in the Canadian Football League.
- Rocco Romano, CFL's DeMarco-Becket Memorial Trophy winner in 1994 & 1996 for the Calgary Stampeders; Awarded originally to the player selected as the outstanding lineman in the West Division. Inducted into the Canadian Football Hall of Fame in 2007.
- Ralph Sazio, Player, coach, GM and president of the Hamilton Tiger-Cats. He won four Eastern finals and three Grey Cups as coach from 1963 to 1967.
- Vince Scott (1925–1992), played for the Hamilton Tiger-Cats, and was later a Hamilton city councillor.
- Jim Young (1943– ), former pro American football and Canadian football player.

== Combat sports ==
=== Boxing ===
- Jackie Callura, (1914–1943), Canadian featherweight Boxer, World featherweight champion 1943.
- Jessica Rakoczy, (1977– ), female Boxer, WBC lightweight Champion (21 July 2005)

=== Mixed martial arts ===
Hamilton has also produced a couple of noteworthy mixed martial arts fighters. One of two most noteworthy is Jeff Joslin, who has a black belt in Brazilian Jiu Jitsu under Romero "Jacare" Cavalcanti, and a 4th degree black belt in Wado Ryu Karate. He has also trained in wrestling and boxing. The other noteworthy fighter from steeltown is Samir Seif. He is a world-class Muay Thai kickboxing champion.

Hamilton is home to Canada's largest grappling tournament the annual Joslin's Canadian Open.

=== Pro wrestling ===
Hamilton has hosted some high-profile professional wrestling events. Copps Coliseum was the venue for the World Wrestling Federation's first-ever Royal Rumble on 24 January 1988, which was broadcast live in the United States on the USA Network, and for the Breakdown: In Your House pay-per-view event on 27 September 1998. In addition, the WWF taped its syndicated television program, WWF All-Star Wrestling, which aired as Maple Leaf Wrestling in Canada, at the Hamilton Convention Centre in October 1984 (two tapings that month), November 1984, and January 1985. From 1987 to 1992, occasionally matches at Copps Coliseum would be taped and shown on WWF Prime Time Wrestling. On 1 June 1992, the WWF's flagship syndicated television program, WWF Superstars, was taped at Copps Coliseum.

Hamilton is also home to a wrestling school called Wrestlecorps Pro Wrestling Academy found on Kenilworth Avenue North near Barton Street and has a history of producing well known pro wrestlers. Some of these include:

- Johnny K-9, (1965–2017), Ion William Croitoru, 4-years in the WWF including match against Hulk Hogan.
- Billy Red Lyons, ex-Pro Wrestler and TV announcer for Maple Leaf Wrestling.
- Angelo Mosca, (1938–2021), was a Canadian Football League player between 1958 and 1969 with the Hamilton Tiger-Cats, but he was better known for his pro wrestling career.
- "Big John" Quinn, (1944–2019), is a retired Canadian professional wrestler who competed in North American regional promotions including NWA All-Star Wrestling, Pacific Northwest Wrestling and Stampede Wrestling during the 1960s and early 1970s. Cousin of former NHL coach and Hamiltonian, Pat Quinn.
- Dewey Robertson, (1939–2007), "The Missing Link" ex-Pro Wrestler.
- Johnny Powers, (1943–2022), ex-Pro Wrestler. 2-time NWF World champion, 1970, 73.
- Ben & Mike Sharpe, ex-Pro Wrestlers. 18 time NWA World tag champions.
- Iron Mike Sharpe Jr., ex-Pro Wrestler. The self-proclaimed "Canada's Greatest Athlete".

== Hockey ==
The Hamilton Tigers played in the NHL during the early 1920s but then the team folded after a player's strike. Tigers owner Percy Thompson of the Abso Pure Ice Company of Hamilton then sold the players rights to New York City bootleggers and the new team was then named the New York Americans and became the first pro sports team to play out of the newly built Madison Square Garden in downtown Manhattan, New York. Hockey Hall-of-Famer Joe Malone was a player/manager for the Tigers hockey club in the 1921–22 season. The team's home rink was the Barton Street Arena. After the team left, a minor-league Hamilton Tigers team was formed, eventually becoming the Syracuse Stars and Buffalo Bisons.

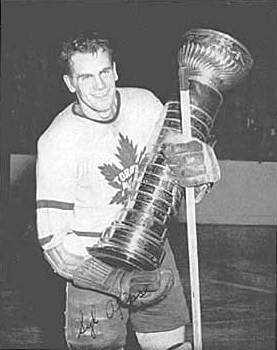
Syl Apps

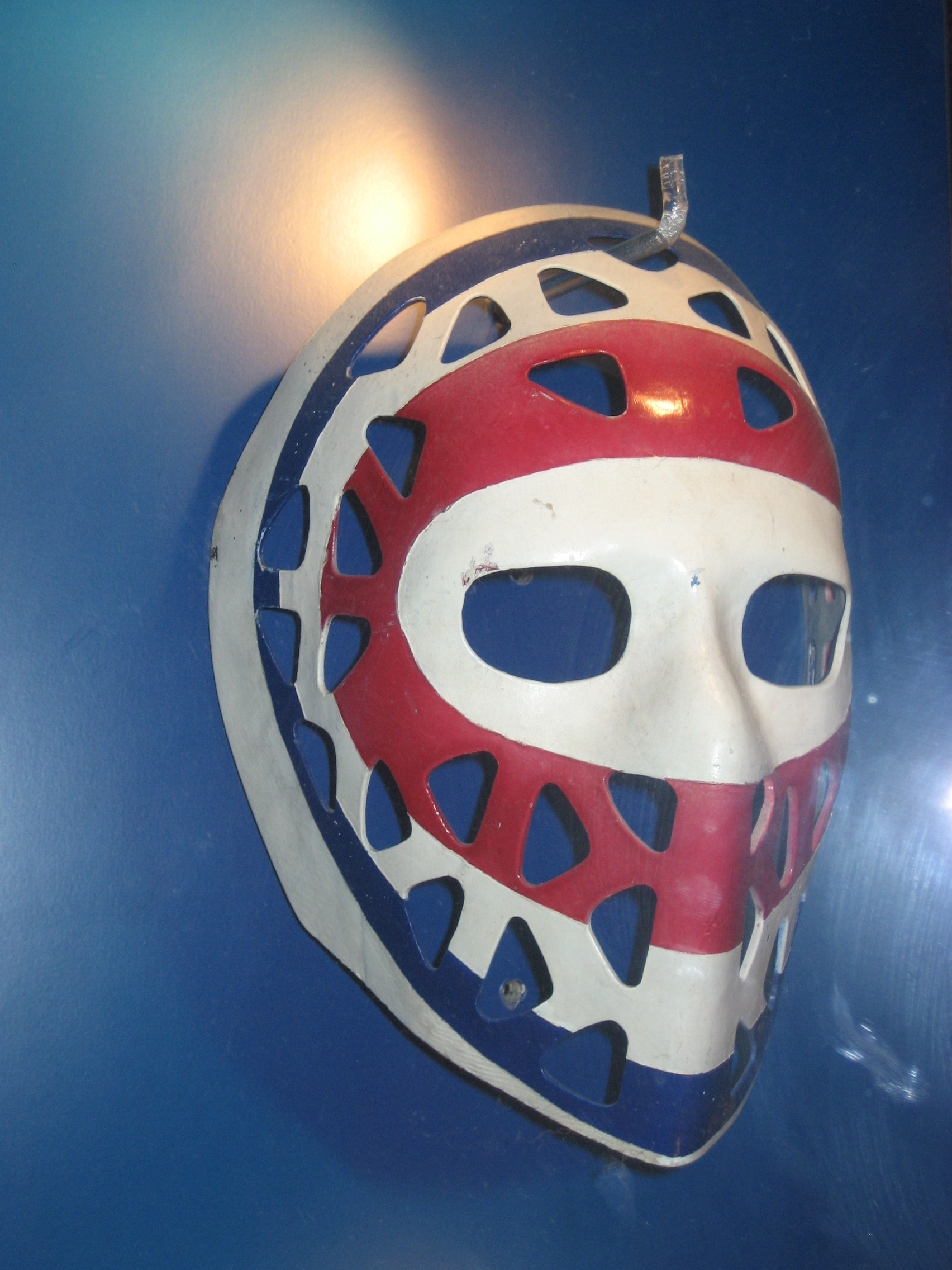
Ken Dryden's goalie mask

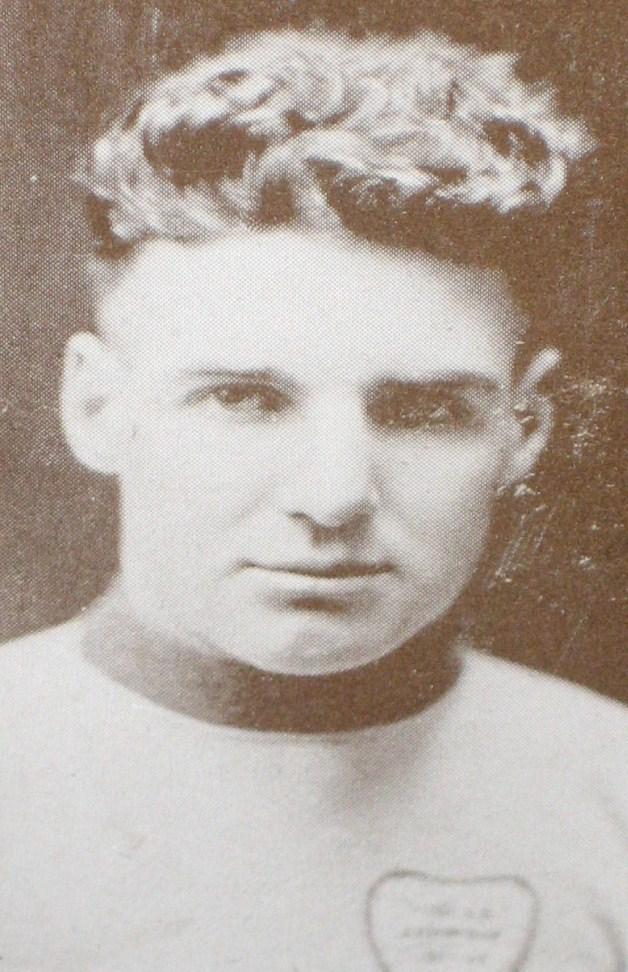
Cecil Babe Dye

There are 35 ice rinks in 27 arenas in the Greater Hamilton area including FirstOntario Centre, Dave Andreychuk Mountain Arena & Skating Centre, Pat Quinn Parkdale Arena, LIUNA 4 Ice Centre, (4 rinks) at Mohawk Sports Park and Chedoke Twin Pad Arena, (2-rinks), on the West mountain.

A number of NHL hockey players have come from the Hamilton region over the years. Some of these include:

- Dave Andreychuk, (1963– ), retired NHL hockey player.
- Syl Apps, (1915–1998), Toronto Maple Leafs captain who led the Leafs to three Stanley Cups. 1936–37 Calder Memorial Trophy winner (Top NHL rookie), 1941–42 Lady Byng Trophy winner. McMaster University Alumni. (Paris Ontario).
- Allan Bester, (1964– ), retired NHL hockey goalie, Toronto Maple Leafs.
- Andy Brown, (1944– ), credited with being the last pro goaltender to play barefaced. Last played his NHL hockey for the Pittsburgh Penguins.
- David Brown, (1985– ), Notre Dame Fighting Irish hockey goalie, named team MVP in 2006, named (CCHA), Central Collegiate Hockey Association's Player-of-the-week 3-times in 2007 and favorite to win the 2007 Hobey Baker Award which is awarded to the top collegiate player in the United States. A Pittsburgh Penguins draft pick in 2004.
- Frank Caprice, (1962– ), retired NHL hockey goalie, 6-seasons with Vancouver Canucks (1982–88).
- Joe Cirella, (1963– ), retired NHL defenseman, 821-games played, #5-pick overall in 1981 NHL Entry Draft by the Colorado Rockies.
- Ken Dryden, (1947– ), retired NHL hockey goalie, elected to the Hockey Hall of Fame in 1983.
- Dave Dryden, (1941– ), retired NHL hockey goalie, 201-NHL games for Buffalo, Edmonton, Chicago and NY Rangers. Also serves the distinction of creating (as well as being the first goaltender to employ) the modern day goaltending mask consisting of a fiberglass mask with a cage.
- Blake Dunlop, (1953– ), retired NHL hockey player, winner of the 1980–81 Bill Masterton trophy.
- Cecil "Babe" Dye, (1898–1962), NHL hockey winger, NHL's top goal scorer of the 1920s, inducted into the Hockey Hall of Fame in 1970. He was nicknamed "Babe" because he was considered to be 'the Babe Ruth of hockey.'
- Don Edwards, (1955– ), retired NHL hockey goalie, winner of Vezina Trophy in 1979–80.
- Nelson Emerson, (1967– ), retired NHL hockey player.
- Ray Emery, (1982–2018), NHL goalie, played for the Ottawa Senators, Chicago Blackhawks and Philadelphia Flyers.
- Todd Harvey, (1975– ), NHL hockey player.
- Red Horner, (1909–2005), retired NHL hockey defenseman, helped Toronto Maple Leafs win their first Stanley Cup in 1932.
- Harry Howell, (1932–2019), retired NHL hockey defenseman. Winner of the 1966–67 James Norris Trophy.
- Willie Huber, (1958–2010), retired NHL hockey defenseman. Born in Germany, grew up in Hamilton.
- Dick Irvin Sr., (1892–1957), NHL hockey player. Former head coach of Toronto Maple Leafs & Montreal Canadiens.
- Al Jensen, (1958– ), retired NHL hockey goalie. Winner of the 1983–84 William Jennings Trophy.
- Derek King, (1967– ), retired NHL hockey player.
- Jamie Macoun, (1961– ), retired NHL hockey defenseman. Played 1,128 NHL games.
- Adam Mair, (1979– ), NHL hockey player.
- Brian McGrattan, (1981– ), NHL hockey player for the Nashville Predators. NHL enforcer.
- Marty McSorley, (1963– ), retired NHL hockey player infamous for his assault of Donald Brashear in a game on 21 February 2001.
- Ron Murphy, (1933– ), retired NHL player who played in 889-games.
- Ric Nattress, (1962– ), retired NHL hockey defenseman.
- Murray Oliver, (1937– ), retired NHL hockey player, played in 1,127 NHL games.
- George Owen, (1901–1986), retired NHL hockey defenceman for the Boston Bruins. Served as the Bruins captain in the 1931–32 season. The first player credited with wearing a helmet in his rookie season in 1928.
- Keith Primeau, (1971– ), retired NHL hockey player. Born in Toronto, grew up in Hamilton.
- Pat Quinn, (1943–2014), retired NHL hockey player, and former head coach of the Toronto Maple Leafs, Vancouver Canucks, Los Angeles Kings and the Philadelphia Flyers.
- Leo Reise Jr., (1922– ), retired NHL hockey defenseman. 494-games played in the 1940s & 50s for Detroit, Chicago and NY Rangers.
- Rick Smith, (1948– ), retired NHL hockey defenseman. 687-games played. #7-pick in 1966 NHL Entry draft by the Boston Bruins.
- Steve Staios, (1973– ), NHL hockey defenseman.
- Danny Syvret, 1985– ), NHL hockey defenseman, who spent his junior career with the London Knights of the OHL, eventually being named team captain. In his final year of junior hockey, he was captain of a powerhouse team that broke numerous junior hockey records and won the 2005 Memorial Cup. (Millgrove, ON)
- John Tonelli, (1957– ), retired NHL hockey player. 1984 Canada Cup MVP.
- John Mitchell, (1985– ), Canadian professional ice hockey centre currently playing for the Colorado Avalanche of the National Hockey League (NHL). He was drafted in the fifth round, 158th overall by the Toronto Maple Leafs in the 2003 NHL Entry Draft.

Note: Tim Horton, retired NHL hockey defenseman, opened his first Tim Hortons Doughnut Shop in Hamilton, Ontario in 1964.

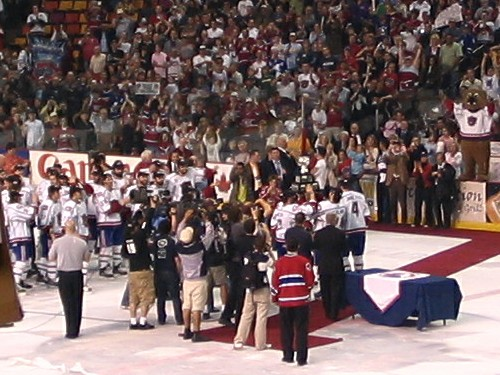
The Hamilton Bulldogs celebrate their Calder Cup win in 2007

=== Hamilton Bulldogs ===
Copps Coliseum Arena was the home ice for the Hamilton Bulldogs of the American Hockey League from 1996 to 2015. When the Edmonton Oilers announced plans to suspend operations of the previous Hamilton Bulldogs franchise in 2002, local interests in conjunction with the Oilers, Montreal Canadiens and the AHL secured ownership of the Quebec Citadelles and relocated the franchise to Hamilton assuring the continuation of the Bulldogs team. The team's primary affiliates were the Edmonton Oilers from 1996 to 2003 and the Montreal Canadiens from 2002 to 2015. The Bulldogs reached the final of the Calder Cup Championship in 1997 and 2003 only to lose in the finals on both occasions and then finally winning it all, their third attempt, in 2007 defeating the Hershey Bears.

In 2015, the Montreal Canadiens repurchased the Bulldogs franchise from team owner Michael Andlauer with the intention of relocating their affiliate to become the St. John's IceCaps. In response to losing his AHL team, Andlauer purchased the Ontario Hockey League's Belleville Bulls franchise and made a new Bulldogs team, albeit in a major junior league.

=== Hamilton Hammers ===
In 2026, the New York Islanders moved their AHL affiliate to Hamilton which became the Hamilton Hammers.

=== Hockey tournaments ===
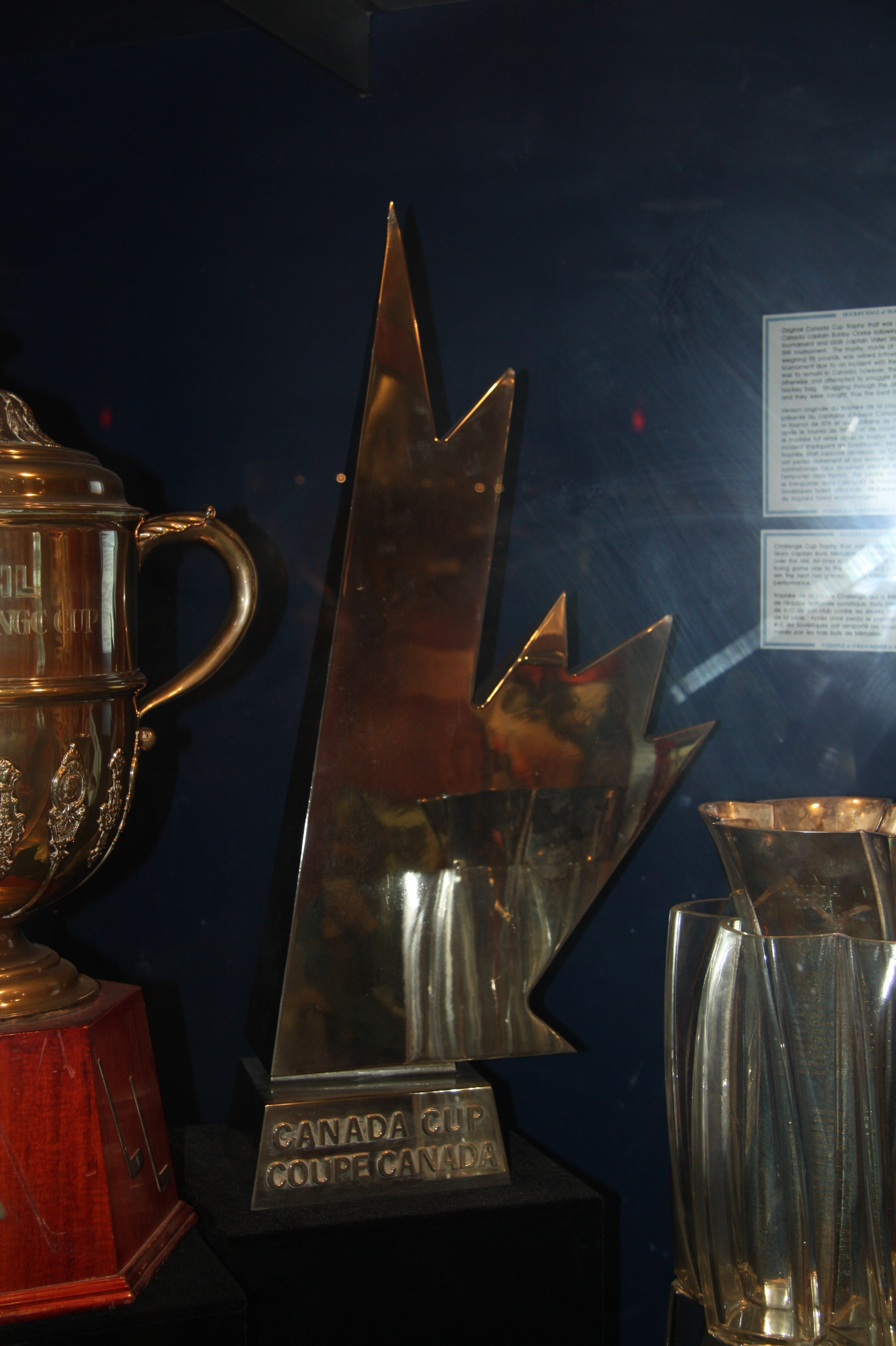
Canada Cup trophy

The Victor K. Copps Coliseum was built downtown on Bay Street North. The sports and entertainment arena, named for a former mayor and father of Sheila Copps, has hosted the 1986 World Junior Ice Hockey Championship Games where the Soviets captured gold against Team Canada with a top scoring line that consisted of Sergei Fedorov, Alexander Mogilny and Pavel Bure.

Hamilton also hosted the 1987 Canada Cup, which featured dynamic duo Wayne Gretzky and Mario Lemieux combine forces to defeat the Soviets. Hamilton also hosted the 1991 Canada Cup where Canada won the tournament once more, this time against Brett Hull and the Americans.

In 1990, Copps Coliseum hosted the Memorial Cup tournament that featured a young Eric Lindros playing on the eventual winners; Oshawa Generals. The Generals defeated the Kitchener Rangers in an All-Ontario Finals, the game went into triple overtime.

Hamilton also set attendance records at the time of hosting each one of the above-mentioned hockey tournaments.

Hamilton-based hockey teams have captured the Memorial Cup twice. The Hamilton Red Wings in 1962 which featured Pit Martin & the 1972 Summit Series hero Paul Henderson. In 1976 the Hamilton Fincups captured the trophy which featured future NHL stars Willie Huber, Al Jensen, Dale McCourt, Al Secord and Ric Seiling.

=== NHL expansion ===
In recent decades, Hamilton has shown interest in an NHL franchise and built the Copps Coliseum (now the FirstOntario Centre) in anticipation. It has been continually disappointed, and voted against by nearby Buffalo and Toronto, who potentially could lose revenue if Hamilton had an NHL franchise. Hamilton arguably came closest to landing an NHL franchise in 1990, when 14,000 Hamilton hockey fans made Non-refundable downpayments for season's tickets in less than 24 hours. However, according to Phil Esposito, the bid was blocked by Seymour Knox III (then owner of the Buffalo Sabres) and the Toronto Maple Leafs organizations. Out of all the bids submitted, the Hamilton bid, led by Tim Horton's co-founder Ron Joyce, became the only group to meet all the necessary criteria established by the NHL. However, the NHL awarded Ottawa and Tampa the new expansion teams, as the two cities were the only applicants who could pay the full expansion fee of US$50 million dollars. Joyce could not afford to pay upfront, and instead proposed annual payments.

One of the biggest endorsements for Hamilton's quest for an NHL team came from hockey legend Wayne Gretzky, who was quoted as saying that "Hamilton and the Southwestern Ontario region could definitely support a National Hockey League team" and also that "there is a lot of red tape but these kind of things have a way of working themselves out and both the corporate and commercial support would be there for a team in Hamilton". An NHL team based out of Copps Coliseum would make it the closest NHL rink to Wayne Gretzky's hometown of Brantford, Ontario.

=== PWHL ===
On May 13, 2026, Hamilton was awarded an expansion team in the Professional Women's Hockey League, the Hamilton Havoc.

== Lacrosse ==
On 3 February 2011, it was announced that the Toronto Nationals of Major League Lacrosse would relocate to Hamilton and be renamed the Hamilton Nationals. It was also announced that they would play their home games at Ron Joyce Stadium on the campus of McMaster University.

On 21 November 2013, the MLL announced that the team would not participate in the 2014 season, with most of the players being transferred to the expansion Florida Launch. The team is expected to attempt to rejoin the league for the 2015 season once construction of the new Tim Hortons Field in Hamilton is completed, much like the Rochester Rattlers did for the 2011 season.

On May 11, 2021, the Toronto Rock of the National Lacrosse League announced that the Rock would relocate from Scotiabank Arena in Toronto to FirstOntario Centre in Hamilton with a 5-year arena lease with an option to extend the agreement afterwards. Their relocation will commence in time for the beginning of the 2021-22 NLL Season in December and the team name will not be changed despite the relocation to Hamilton for branding reasons.

== Racing sports ==
=== Auto racing ===
Hamilton and area is also the home of two auto race tracks. The first one is the Jukasa Motor Speedway, in Hagersville, a 5/8-mile oval auto racing track which is under new ownership and currently under major renovations. The last major event there was on 2–3 September (2006); The Canadian Association for Stock Car Racing (CASCAR) Labour Day Classic which featured the Super and Sportsman series. Rogers Sportsnet televised the Super Series race. The touring CASCAR series has been staging races since 1981. Jukasa Motor Speedway was considered one of Canada's top racing venues and attracted some of racing's top drivers, including Richard Petty, Al Unser, Cale Yarborough, Dale Earnhardt, the Allisons (Bobby, Davey, Donnie and Kenny) and Benny Parsons. The second auto race track in Hamilton is the Flamboro Speedway, 1/3-mile semi banked asphalt oval auto racing track. Established in 1961 and has provided excellent grass roots stock car racing action every year since – Making it one of Canada's longest running stock car tracks.

=== Horse racing ===
Hamilton is also home of Flamboro Downs; Canada's fastest half-mile harness horse racing track. Set on 220 acres (89 ha) on Highway No. 5 west, between highways 6 and 8, flamboro downs has grown substantially since its April 1975 opening. Races are held five days a week. A typical flamboro downs live race card will include at least 10 or 11 races, and often more. In addition to the live flamboro downs harness racing, both thoroughbred and standardbred racing from other tracks across North America are simulcast daily from 12 noon. An off-track betting network offers racing from teletheatres in Hamilton, Brantford, Burlington and Stoney Creek.

Hamilton is the birthplace of three jockeys in Thoroughbred horse racing whose success led to them being inducted in the Canadian Horse Racing Hall of Fame and they are; Jeffrey Fell, Chris Rogers and Don Seymour.

== Soccer ==
Hamilton is home of the Hamilton and District Soccer Association. The H&DSA is one of Ontario's oldest soccer organizations. The Association represents many soccer organization from many surrounding communities such as Brantford, Glanbrook, Stoney Creek, Ancaster, Dundas and Hamilton.

Hamilton hosts the tier-1 Forge FC of the Canadian Premier League since 2019. Hamilton also hosts Hamilton United FC, the division 3 women's team in League1 Ontario. Hamilton formerly had Hamilton City SC in the Canadian Soccer League.

Hamilton is also home to 3 soccer leagues and they include; the Hamilton & District Multi-Jurisdictional Soccer League the Hamilton & District Oldtimers Soccer League and the third is the Hamilton Senior Mens Soccer League.

Hamilton was home of the Hamilton Steelers of the Canadian Soccer League between 1982 and 1992. They were the 1986 National Champions and played their home games at the 5,000 seat Brian Timmis Stadium. The city was previously represented in the Canadian Professional/Soccer League with the Hamilton Thunder operating from 2002 to 2005, and Hamilton Croatia in 2010.

Hamilton was previously home to the Hamilton Avalanche, a Canadian women's soccer team from the W-League. They were founded in 2006. Hamilton was also previously home to Hamilton Rage of the PDL, founded in 2011, however both teams moved to Kitchener-Waterloo following the 2012 season.

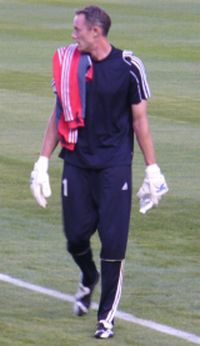
Greg Sutton, Toronto FC goalie

Hamilton has been home to or has produced a number of pro soccer players over the years. Some of these include:

- Valerio Alesi, (1966– ), first Canadian-born player to play in the Serie A Soccer.
- Chris Baker, (1985– ), is a Canadian soccer goalkeeper. (Waterdown, ON)
- Bob Bearpark, (1943–1996), was a Canadian soccer head coach.
- Alex Bunbury, (1967– ), Played 4 seasons with the Hamilton Steelers (CSL) 1987–90, Voted best Foreign player in the Portuguese first division club Maritimo in 1994–95 season where he scored 12-goals. Canadian Soccer Hall-of-Fame inductee in 2006.
- Jamie Dodds, (1981– ), Canadian soccer player who currently plays for the Toronto Lynx in the USL First Division.
- Rhian Dodds, (1979– ), is a midfielder for Kilmarnock F.C., (Scottish Soccer).
- Milan Kojic, (1976– ), Canadian soccer player who currently plays for the F.K. Haugesund in Adeccoligaen.
- Robert McDonald, (1902–1956), was a Canadian soccer player from the 1920s and 30s who spent a decade playing for famous Scottish football club Rangers.
- John McGrane, ( – ), He played nine North American Soccer League seasons and 17 times for the Canadian national soccer team in 'A' internationals. He also played in the Montreal Olympics. In 2008 was inducted into the Canada's Soccer Hall-of-Fame.
- Jimmy Nicholl, (1956– ), Northern Irish Football player, 73 International caps.
- Carrie Serwetnyk, (1965– ), Played 19-times for Canada's Women's National team. Canadian Soccer Hall-of-Fame inductee in 2001.
- Greg Sutton, (1977– ), Canadian International Soccer Goalkeeper (Toronto FC).

== Other sports ==
Hammer City Roller Girls 2006–present (www.hammercityrollergirls.ca)

- Frank O'Rourke, (1894–1986), ex-pro baseball player and long time New York Yankees scout.
- Shona Thorburn, (1982– ), WNBA pro basketball player, currently playing for the Minnesota Lynx. Attended Westdale Secondary School in Hamilton.
- William "Red" Wray, former scout for the New York Yankees and Houston Astros, former scout for OHL teams as the St. Michael's Majors and the Barrie Colts, and member of the Canadian Boxing Hall of Fame in the Builders category.

== See also ==
- Panam Sports
