= Crosstown Plaza =

Strip mall in Schenectady, New York

Coordinates: 42.78401°N 73.91918°W

Crosstown Plaza is a large strip mall in Schenectady, New York (at the Rotterdam-Schenectady line) along Watt Street and NY State Route 7 near the I-890 entrance. As of January 1991, the strip mall consisted of 183,500 square feet (17,050 square meters). By August 1995, it was 193,500 square feet (17,980 square meters).

== Tenants ==
Over the years, tenants have included:

Tenant Name	Opening Date
Chuck E. Cheese (Pizza Time Theatre)	Around Quarter 2, 1983; (closed unrecognizable)
Price Chopper	1970s (closed this location March, 2002)
Caldor	1979 (closed January, 1999) (85,000 sq ft (7,900 m^{2}))
Red Cross Blood Donor Center	1985
Spa Lady	before July 25, 1986
Champion Factory Outlet	before May 10, 1990 (closed by December 31, 2004)
American Cancer Society	before May, 1993
Nutri/System Inc.	before May, 1993 (closed at that point, reopened August 9, 1993)
BuyerSmart	unknown, closed late 1993/early 1994
Old Country Buffet (free-standing building)	between 1994 and 1995April 29, 1999 (closed November 17, 2008) - Has since been a Chinese Buffet Restaurant
P.T. Barnum's Magical Emporium	before December, 1995
Sears Hardware	approximately 1996 After this closed the space became a Grossman's Bargain Outlet in 2010 closing announcement in May, 2006
Fabric Bonanza	before March, 1997
Fay's Drugs	unknown (store name changed to Eckerd as of April 21, 1997) and closed shortly after the purchase of Eckerd by Rite Aid. Space is now part of the Ocean State store.
WOW Family Amusement Center	before April 29, 1999
Ames	July 20, 2000 (closed October 19, 2002), with PriceRite and Best Fitness splitting the space.)
Tuesday Morning	September, 2000
King Cork Wine & Liquors	before February, 2002
Yankee One Dollar	before September, 2002
PriceRite	October 16, 2002 (25,000 sq ft (2,300 m^{2}))
Household Finance	after October 23, 2004
Ocean State Job Lot	before March 10, 2007, with a later expansion into the former Eckerd space after that store closed. (expansion plans)

== Considered as a DMV location ==
In mid-1990, Schenectady County considered moving a DMV office in either Crosstown Plaza, Mohawk Mall, or Rotterdam Square Mall. However, the county legislature ultimately decided against the move. If moved, annual rent at Crosstown Plaza would have cost $29,640.

== Finding a new grocer ==
When Price Chopper left a space it held in the plaza for decades (moving to newly built Mohawk Commons) in March 2002, the plaza was without a grocery store. The owners obviously needed to fill the space, but looked specifically for a grocery store over other store formats. The population in that area was without a nearby grocery store after the Price Chopper vacancy. A grocery store also brings in the type of frequent traffic needed to support other stores in the plaza. After writing to numerous companies, even asking companies that typically use smaller space to consider a larger format, PriceRite happened to learn about this space. The former Price Chopper space became PriceRite's first location in the New York Capital Region. PriceRite later moved into the former Ames located in the same plaza in 2007. Ocean State Job Lot later occupied the vacant PriceRite and has also expanded into space next door that was a Fay's (Later Eckerd) drugstore before that closed when Rite Aid bought the Eckerd chain.

== Former Sears Hardware ==
Sear's Hardware vacated the plaza in 2006, leaving it empty since. This space was frequently used for large liquidation sales for a few years. It was announced in November 2009 that Grossman's Bargain Outlet, located on Erie Blvd., would be moving its store into the former Sears Hardware building. It was opened in February 2010.

== Ownership ==
As of July 1990, Crosstown Plaza was owned by Wade Lupe Construction Company, a developer in Schenectady County. By April 1994, the construction company's name was Hexam Gardens Construction Company.
