= List of sports venues in Hamilton, Ontario =

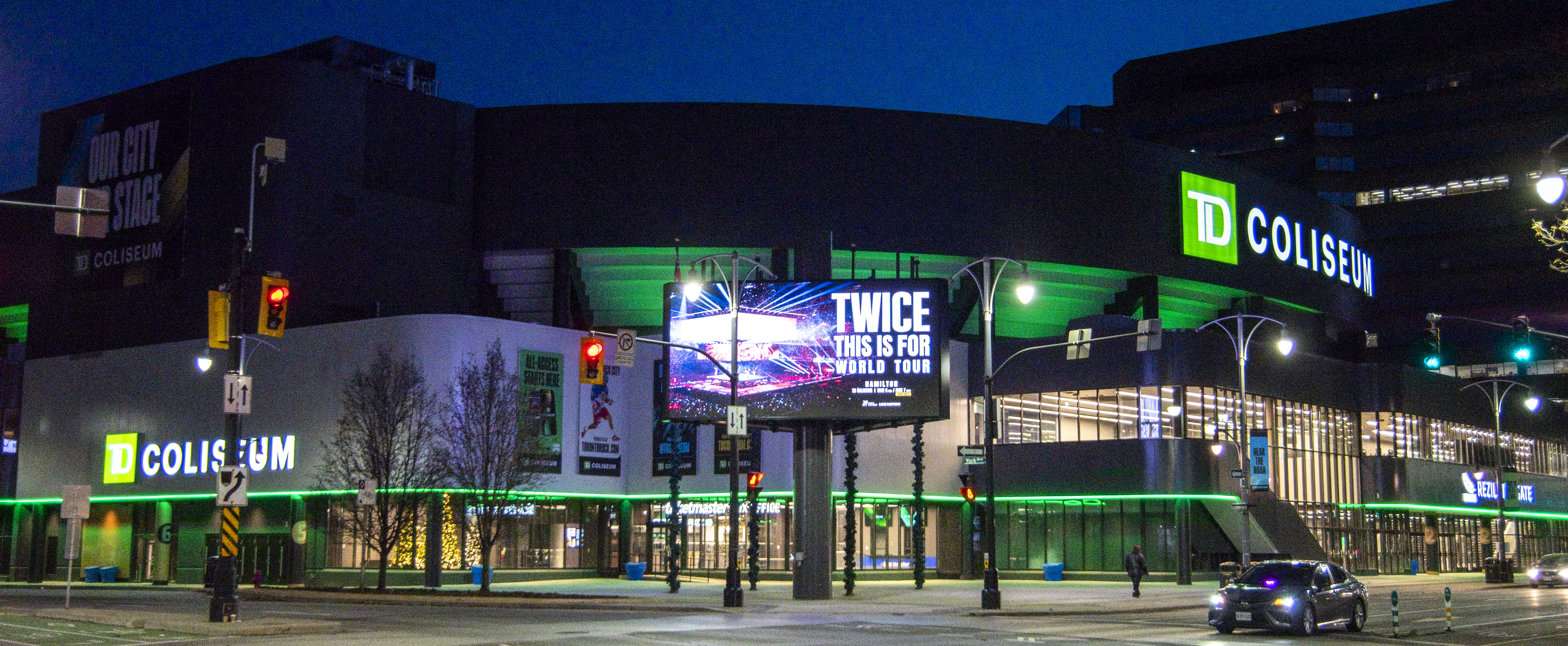
TD Coliseum in December 2025.

Hamilton is home to several sports venues which are used for professional and amateur sports. The largest venue in the city is Hamilton Stadium, an outdoor Canadian football and soccer stadium which was built in 2014 and seats approximately 24,000. The largest indoor venue is TD Coliseum, a multi-use arena with a capacity of 18,000.

Two new sports venues opened up in Hamilton, Ontario in 2007–08, both of which are on the McMaster University grounds. The first is the $23-million Ron Joyce Stadium, and the second is the $30-million David Braley Athletic Centre.

The 6,000-seat Ron Joyce Stadium is primarily a football stadium but is also used for soccer. Extensive renovations were also done to the gym at the Ivor Wynne Centre. Total cost of the upgrades was $54 million.

== Ice arenas ==
Hamilton Arena Listing:

- Barton Street Arena (demolished in 1977)
- Chedoke Twin Pad Arena (2 rinks)
- TD Coliseum. Current home of the Hamilton Hammers and the Hamilton Havoc.
- Dave Andreychuk Mountain Arena & Skating Centre
- Hamilton Doublerink Arena (2 rinks)
- LIUNA 4 Ice Centre (4 rinks)

== Stadiums ==
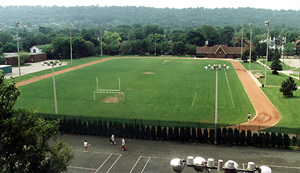
HAAA Grounds

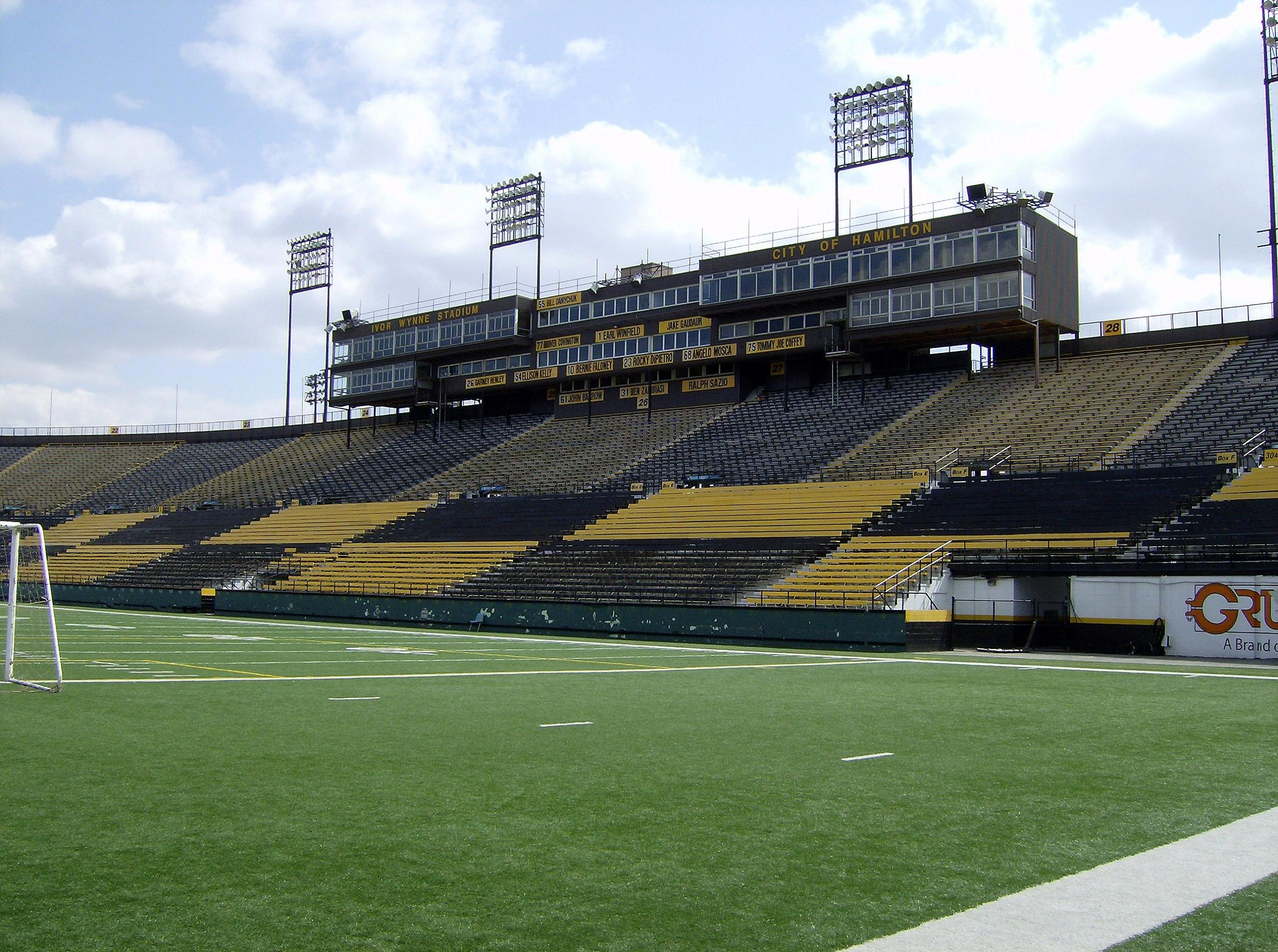
Ivor Wynne Stadium

- A.A.A. Grounds, is a park that was home to the Hamilton Tiger-Cats from 1872–1949.
- Bernie Arbour Memorial Stadium, 3,000 seater at the Mohawk Sports Park. Home of the Hamilton Cardinals.
- Ivor Wynne Stadium, 30,000 seater. Now the site of the current Hamilton Stadium. Former home of the CFL Hamilton Tiger-Cats.
- Hamilton Stadium 24,000 seat stadium. Current home of the Hamilton Tiger-cats and Forge FC.
- Brian Timmis Stadium, 5,000-seat soccer stadium.
- Ron Joyce Stadium (McMaster University), 6,000 seat stadium, opened in 2007.

== Athletic centres ==
- David Braley Athletic Centre (McMaster University), opened in 2007

== Race tracks ==
- Flamboro Downs, Canada's fastest half-mile harness horse racing track.
- Flamboro Speedway, 1/3-mile semi banked asphalt oval auto racing track. It was established in 1961 and has provided excellent grass roots stock car racing action every year since, making it one of Canada's longest-running stock car tracks.

== Marinas ==
- Royal Hamilton Yacht Club
