= David Braley =

Canadian businessman and politician (1941–2020)

The Honourable David Braley OC
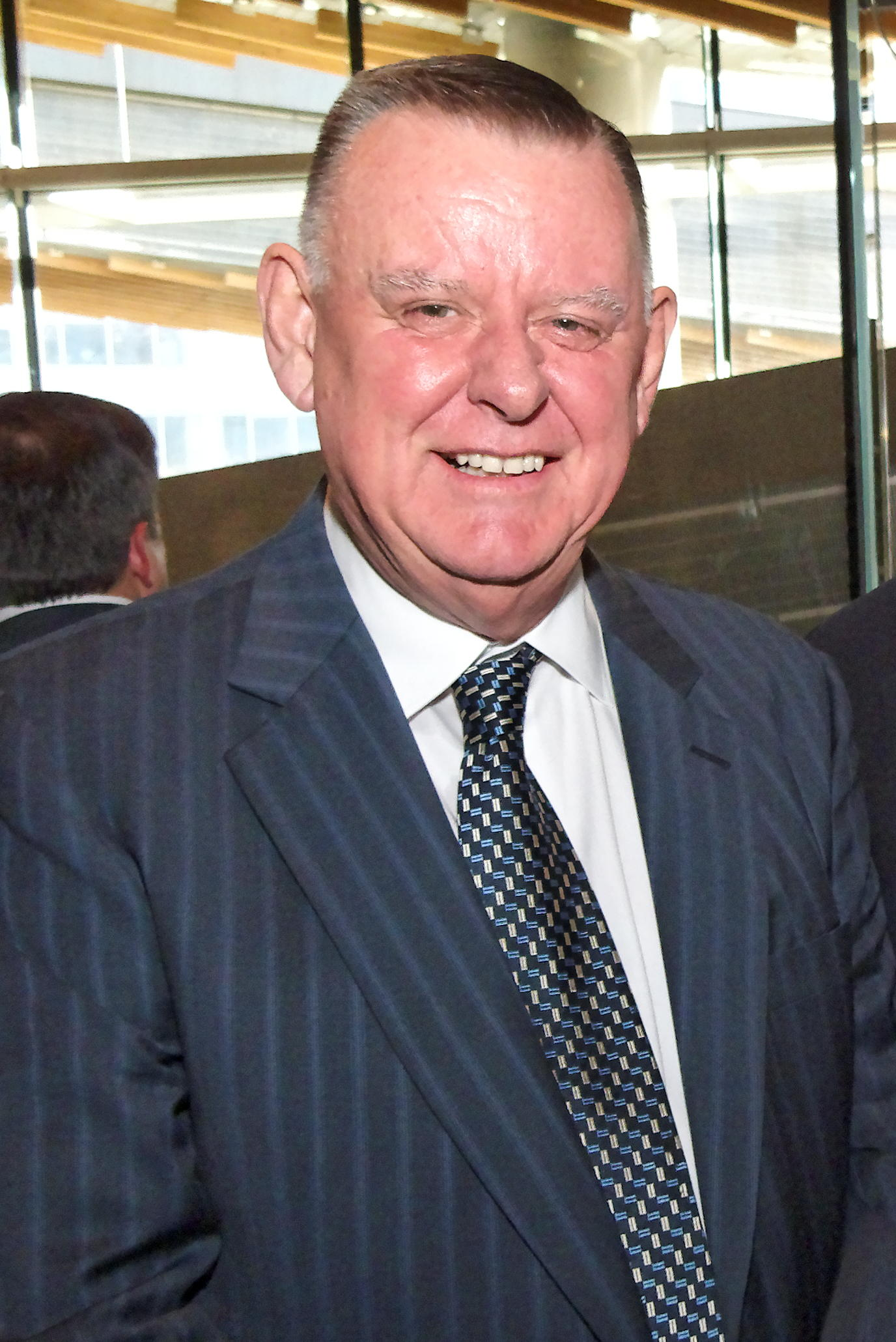
- Braley in 2010

Canadian Senator from Ontario
- In office 20 May 2010 – 30 November 2013
- Preceded by: Wilbert Keon

Personal details
- Born: David Osborn Braley; May 31, 1941 Montreal, Quebec, Canada
- Died: October 26, 2020 (aged 79) Burlington, Ontario, Canada
- Party: Conservative
- Education: McMaster University
- Occupation: Politician; businessman
- Football career

Profile
- Position: Owner

Career history
- 1987–1990: Hamilton Tiger-Cats
- 1997–2000: Vancouver 86ers
- 1997–2020: BC Lions
- 2010–2015: Toronto Argonauts

Awards and highlights
- 4× Grey Cup champion (2000, 2006, 2011, 2012)
- Canadian Football Hall of Fame (Class of 2012)

David Osborn Braley OC (31 May 1941 – 26 October 2020) was a Canadian businessman and politician who was the owner of three Canadian Football League (CFL) teams during his lifetime: the BC Lions, Toronto Argonauts, and Hamilton Tiger-Cats. He was appointed to the Senate of Canada in 2010 as a Conservative, but resigned three years later stating no official reason. He was a member of the Order of Canada and the Canadian Football Hall of Fame.

== Early life ==
Braley was born in Montreal and raised in Hamilton, Ontario, where he attended McMaster University. Braley began his business career with GMAC (now Ally Financial) in Hamilton, before joining London Life Insurance. In 1969, he purchased William Orlick Limited (now Orlick Industries Limited), an auto parts manufacturer based in Stoney Creek, Ontario and remained its owner and president. He lived in Burlington, Ontario.

== Sports career ==
Braley owned the Hamilton Tiger-Cats from 1987 until 1990 when the team returned to community ownership. He returned to the CFL with his purchase of the Lions in 1997. He also owned the Vancouver 86ers soccer club, later the Vancouver Whitecaps, of the A-League, keeping professional soccer alive from 1997 to 2000. In early 2010, he also became owner of the Argonauts, becoming the only person to own two CFL teams simultaneously. In an effort to minimize the ensuing controversy, the league scheduled games between the Lions and Argonauts early in the season in order to avoid possible playoff implications. He announced the sale of the Argonauts to Bell Media and Larry Tanenbaum on May 20, 2015, with the deal to close at the end of the year.

Braley served as the chair of the CFL's Board of Governors and was the CFL's interim commissioner from March 2002 to November 2002. He was also chairman of the 2003 World Cycling Championships in Hamilton.

Braley was a director of Ontario's successful bid to host the 2015 Pan Am Games and was subsequently a member of the board overseeing preparations for the games. Braley resigned upon his appointment to the Senate, as the body's by-laws specifically bar elected officials and senators from serving on the board.

Numerous institutions across Hamilton, Ontario are named in his honour. These include the David Braley Athletic Centre and the David Braley Health Sciences Centre at McMaster University, the David Braley Athletic and Recreation Centre at Mohawk College, and the David Braley Research Institute at the Hamilton General Hospital.

Braley was elected into the Canadian Football Hall of Fame in 2012. He was appointed to the Order of Canada in 2019, in recognition of his contributions to the CFL and his community.

== Political career ==
Braley was appointed to the Senate of Canada on May 20, 2010, to represent the province of Ontario on the advice of Prime Minister Stephen Harper three days after Conservative Senator Wilbert Keon reached mandatory retirement age. A member of the Conservative Party of Canada caucus, Braley had made donations to the Conservative Party and Stephen Harper among others, totaling $86,500, prior to his appointment.

In contrast to the opposition expressed by other professional sports leagues, Senator Braley spoke out in favour of the private member's bill C-290, which went before the Senate and, if passed, would allow the provinces to license single sports betting. He further stated that, due to his position as a sports team owner, he would abstain from voting on the bill. The bill was ultimately stymied in the upper house and did not pass.

Braley resigned from the Senate on November 30, 2013, without stating a reason. However, he had earlier told a newspaper that his wife asked him to consider leaving as the ongoing Canadian Senate expenses scandal was hurting the reputation of all senators. Braley told the Hamilton Community News in September 2013 that "There are four people who are causing the problems for the other 100 senators" and "We are being tarred and feathered" as a result.

== Later years and death ==
Braley was hospitalized in 2016 with a foot infection related to diabetes. He died in his sleep on October 26, 2020, at his home in Burlington, Ontario. He was 79, and suffered from an undisclosed long-term illness.

In his will, Braley is reported to have left a considerable amount of money to the BC Lions organization with the intent that the team be funded for several seasons and be debt free when sold to its next owners. The BC Lions were formally sold to their next owner, Amar Doman, in August 2021.
