= USCGC Mohawk =

The following ships of the United States Coast Guard have been named USCGC Mohawk;

- USCGC Mohawk (WPG-78), a patrol gunboat in service from 1934 to 1946
- USCGC Mohawk (WMEC-913), a Famous-class cutter launched in 1989 and still in service

== See also ==
- USRC Mohawk, a United States Revenue Cutter
- USS Mohawk, warships of the United States Navy
