= Mohawk River (disambiguation) =

The Mohawk River in New York is a tributary of the Hudson River.

Mohawk River may refer one of several rivers in the United States:

- Mohawk River (New Hampshire), a tributary of the Connecticut River
- Mohawk River (Oregon), a tributary of the McKenzie River

== See also ==
- East Branch Mohawk River (New Hampshire)
- West Branch Mohawk River (New Hampshire)
- Mohawk (disambiguation)
