= Sunbeam side-valve aircraft engines =

Overview article on 1910s British aero engine series

Sunbeam, Wolverhampton, England, started to build aircraft engines in 1912. Louis Coatalen joined Sunbeam as chief engineer in 1909, having previously been Chief Engineer at the Humber company works in Coventry. The company quickly became one of the UK's leading engine manufacturers and even designed an aircraft of its own. Sunbeam discontinued the production of aircraft engines after Coatalen left the company in the 1930s.

== Crusader engine ==
In the autumn of 1912, Coatalen designed a V8 engine, which delivered 120 hp at 2500 rpm. It was called the Crusader and was announced in the British aviation press in March 1913. Aircraft manufacturers welcomed this, as no really suitable British engines were available at the time. The company procured a French Farman biplane in which to test the new engine, and also hired a full-time test pilot for the project. This was John Alcock, who later became well known for his famous non-stop Atlantic flight with Arthur Brown. The test flights began in the middle of October 1913, and took place at Brooklands. In December of that year, the aircraft began a long period of intensive flight tests, which ranged over most of southern England and continued until the outbreak of War in 1914.

== Zulu engine ==
The Zulu was developed during 1915. It was identical to the Crusader, except that the bore was increased from 90 mm to 100 mm and the reduction gear ratio was changed, allowing the engine to develop 160 hp at 2000 rpm. The Zulu engine was used in some Coastal Airships.

== Mohawk engine ==
Coatalen's next engine was an enlarged Crusader and was called the Mohawk. The Mohawk was a V12, side-valve engine, and (like the Crusader) was initially built with an 80 mm bore, which was soon increased to 90 mm. With its initial bore it developed 200 hp, when enlarged to 90 mm, it developed 225 hp and became known as the Sunbeam 225. Short seaplanes using this engine were often called "225s" because of this. The engine had two poppet side valves per cylinder, was water-cooled, weighed 905 lb dry, had four Claudel-Hobson carburettors, and two ignition magnetos.

== Gurkha engine ==
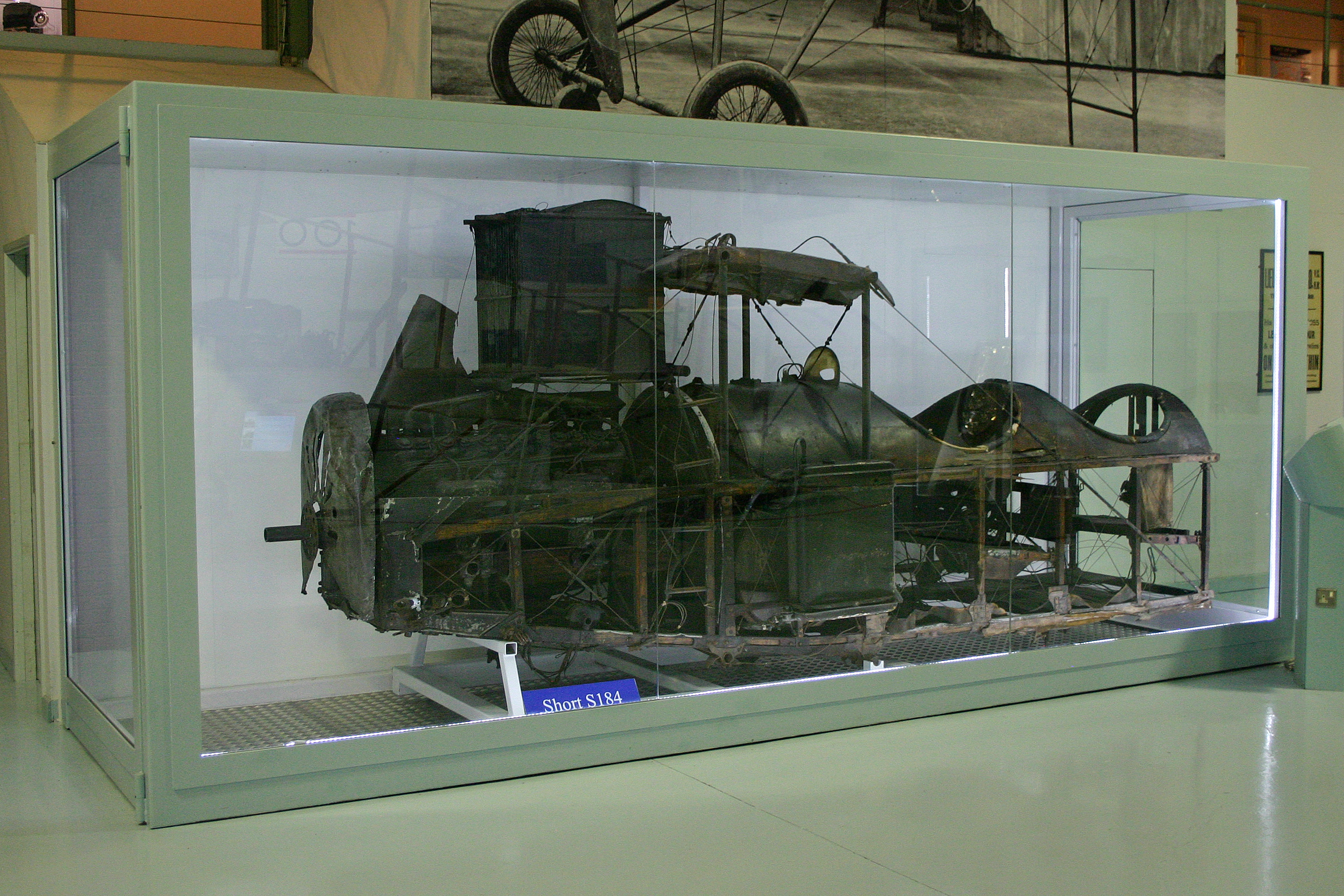
A Sunbeam Gurkha in the remains of a Short Type 184 at the Fleet Air Arm Museum. While Frederick Rutland's aeroplane survived the First World War intact, it was damaged by bombing during the Second World War.

The Gurkha was developed as a replacement for the Mohawk and was of identical design, except that the bore was increased from 90 mm (3.5 in) to 100 mm (3.9 in) and the reduction gearing was reduced from 2:1 to 1.86:1. This allowed the engine to develop 240 hp at 2000 rpm. Production ended in October 1916, after 74 units had been supplied to power the Short Type 184 seaplanes of the Royal Naval Air Service. The Gurkha engine preserved at the Fleet Air Arm Museum, Yeovilton, Somerset, England, is the only surviving Sunbeam side-valve engine in the world. It is installed in the Short 184, aircraft number 8359, that played a minor role in the Battle of Jutland at the end of May 1916. The pilot on that occasion was Flight Lieutenant Frederick Rutland (who was ever after known as "Rutland of Jutland"),
