= Bernie Arbour Memorial Stadium =

Baseball stadium in Hamilton, Ontario

- Interactive map of Bernie Arbour Memorial Stadium
- Address: Hamilton, Ontario; Canada
- Coordinates: 43°12′40.6″N 79°49′18.4″W
- Capacity: 3,000
- Surface: Grass
- Field size: Left field – 300 ft; Left-center – 365 ft; Center field – 405 ft; Right-center – 365 ft; Right field – 325 ft

Construction
- Opened: 1970; 56 years ago

Tenants
- Hamilton Redbirds (NYPL) 1988–1992; Hamilton Cardinals (CBL)

Bernie Arbour Memorial Stadium is a stadium on Upper Kenilworth Avenue in Hamilton, Ontario, Canada. Located in Mohawk Sports Park, it is primarily used for baseball and was once the home of the minor league Hamilton Redbirds of the New York–Penn League. Built in 1970 when Civic Stadium was renovated to football only, it is named for former Hamilton Police Sergeant Bernie Arbour, who was the director of the Hamilton Police Minor Athletic Association from 1948 to his death in 1967.

The Stadium is currently the home of the Hamilton Cardinals of the Canadian Baseball League. The ballpark has a capacity of 3,000 people.

Bernie Arbour Stadium dimensions are 300 feet down the left field line, 325 down right field, 365 to left-centre, 405 to straight-away centre and 365 to the power alley in right-centre. The main grandstand accommodates upwards of 300 spectators and another 1,000+ spectators can be seated in the first and third base bleachers. The Press Box seats up to 10 members of the media and is capable of supporting radio and television broadcasts.

== Images ==
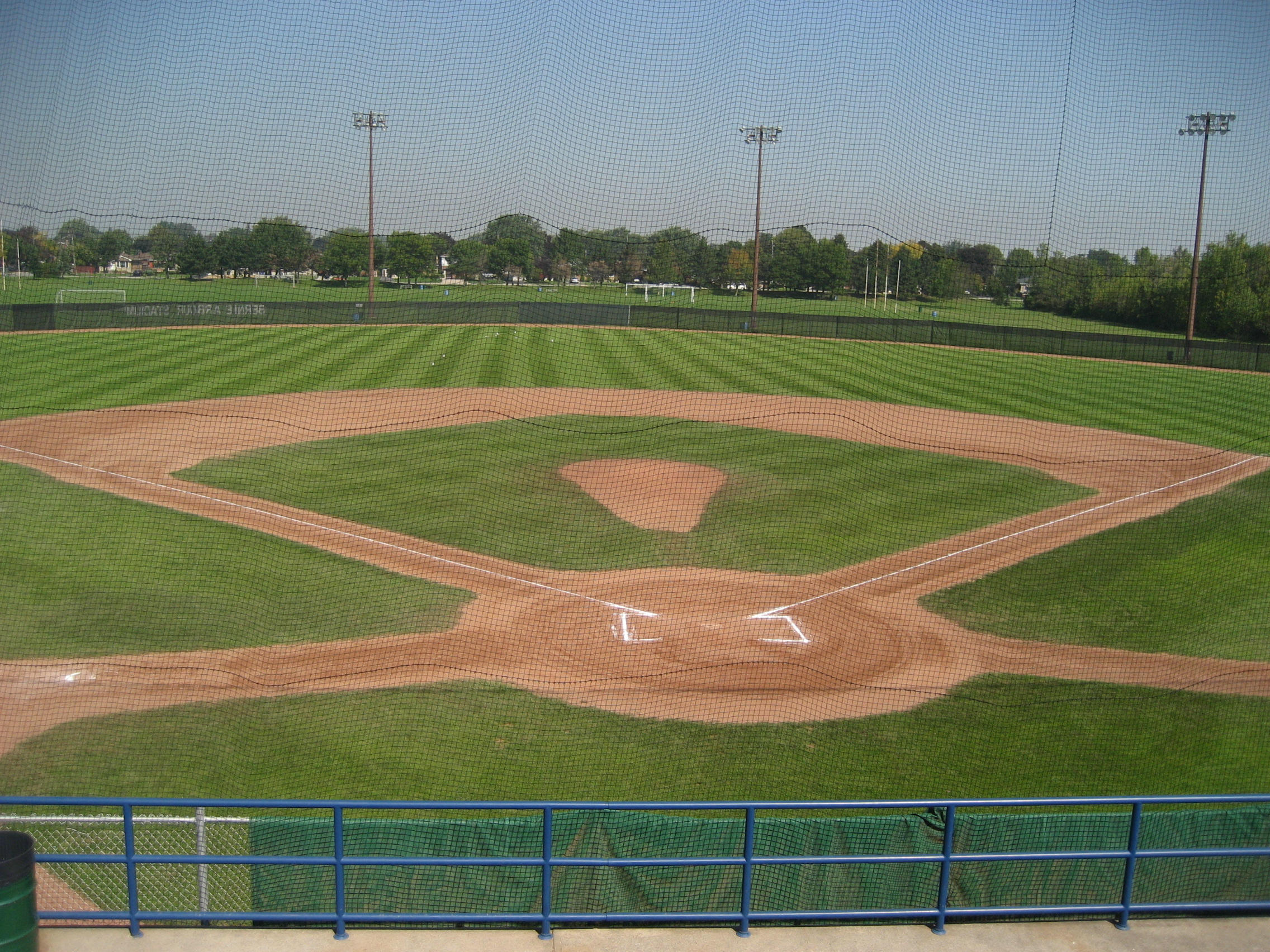

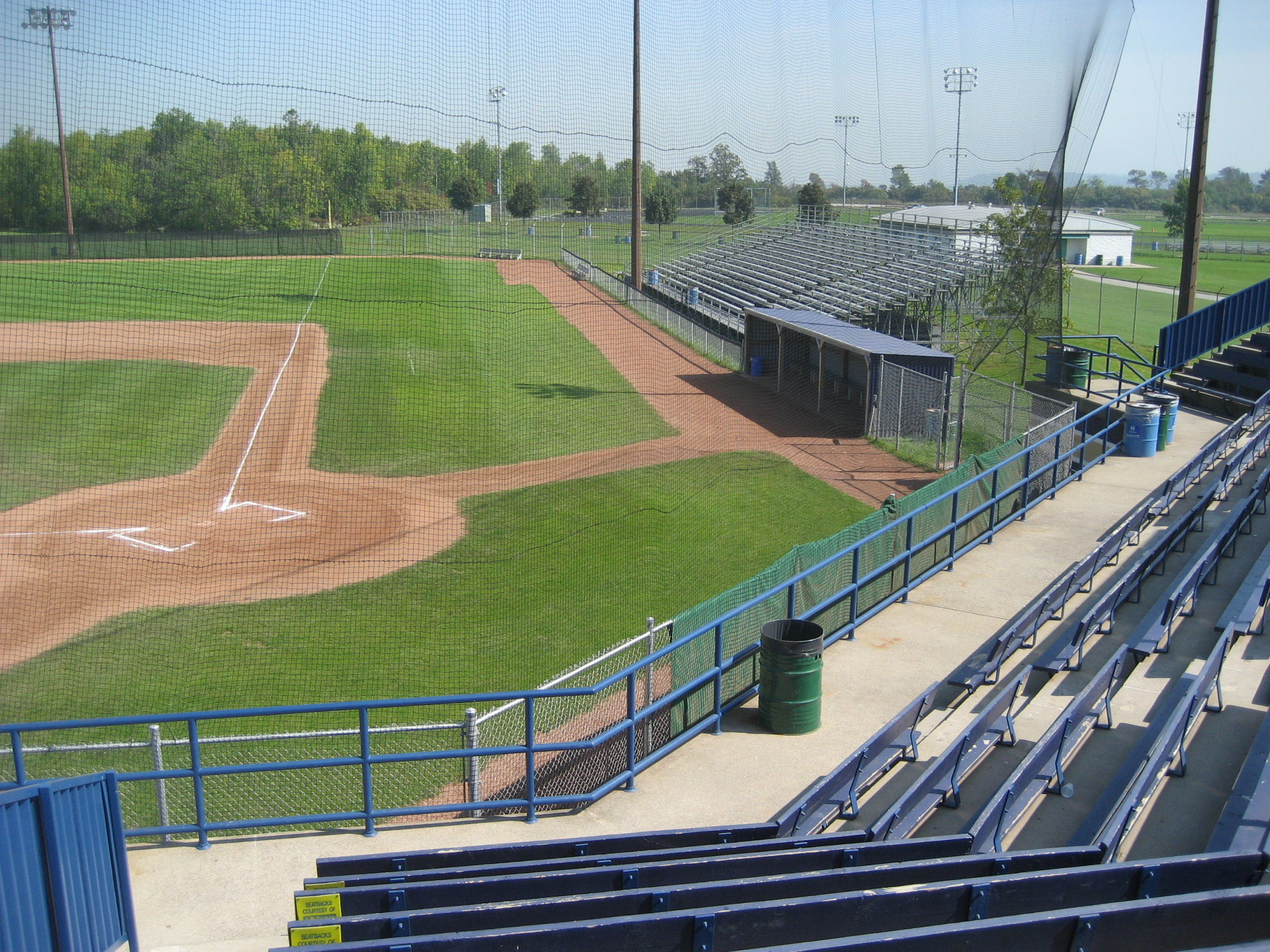

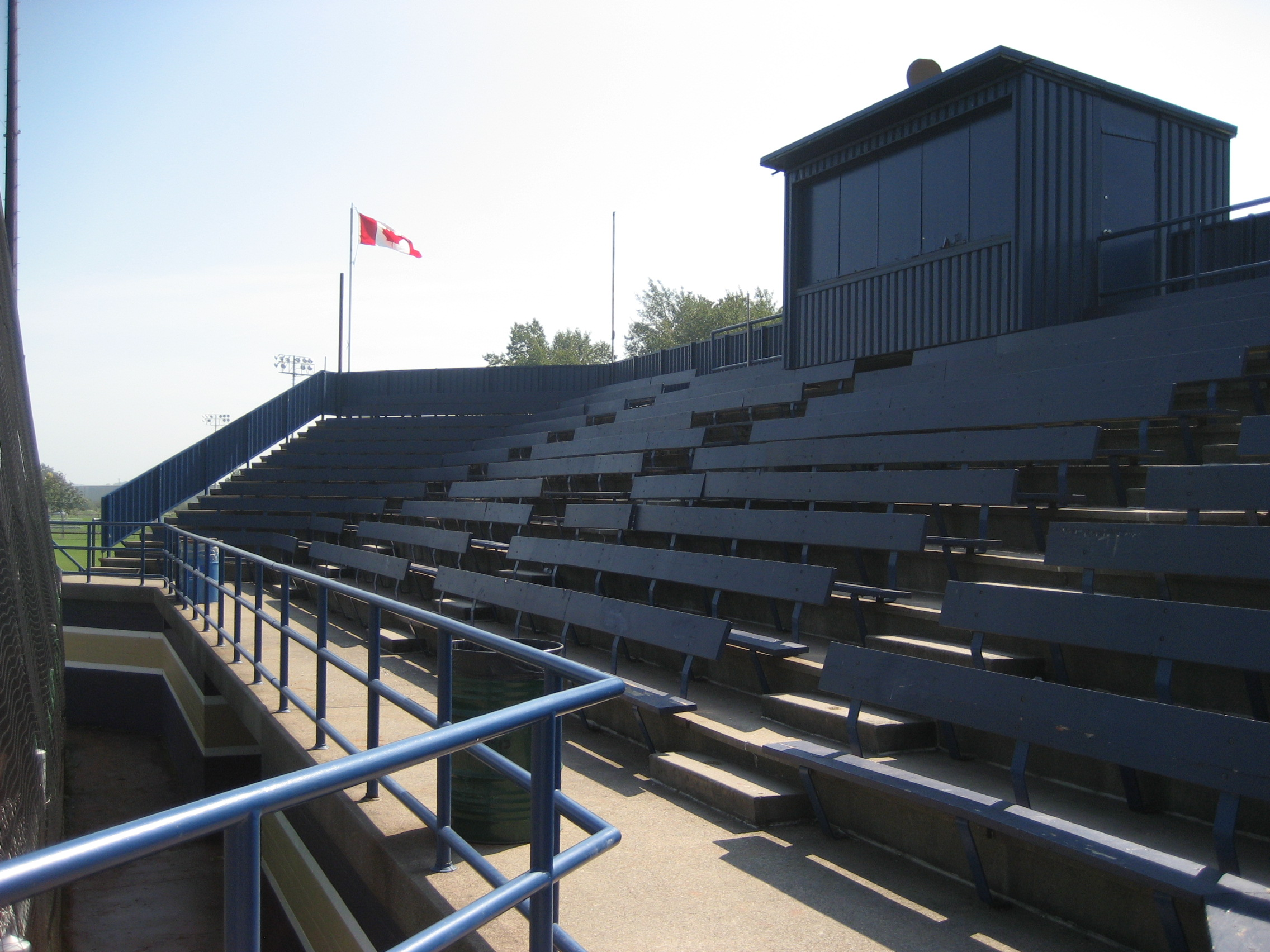

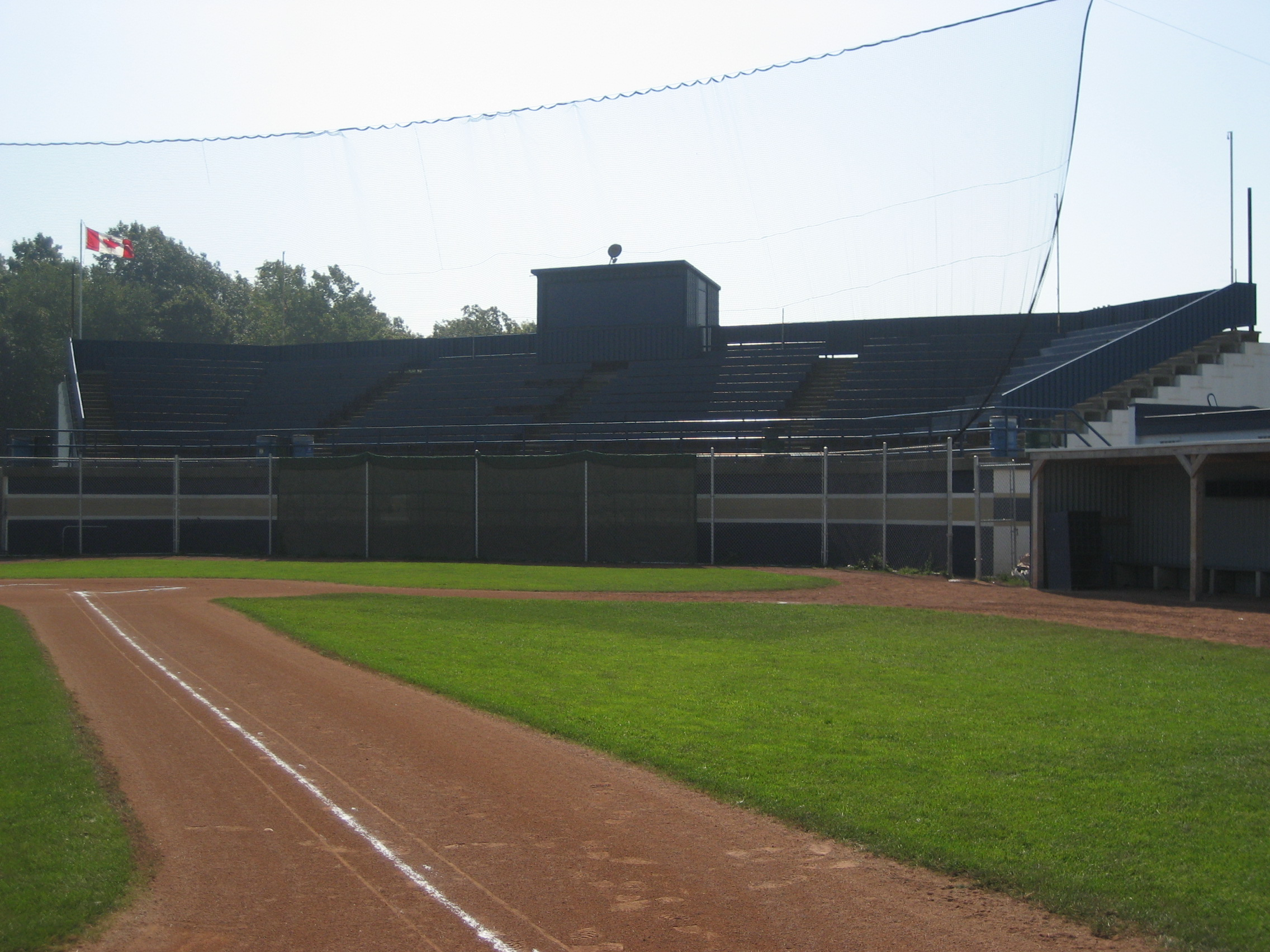

== See also ==
- List of sports venues in Hamilton, Ontario
