= David Braley Athletic Centre =

Athletics facility in Hamilton, Ontario

Coordinates: 43.266769°N 79.915752°W

The David Braley Athletic Centre is an athletics facility located at the campus of McMaster University, in Hamilton, Ontario, Canada. Named after former Canadian senator David Braley, the facility was opened in 2007, with McMaster students paying a year-round membership fee to support the facility as part of their mandatory student union fees.

The 12,300 square metres (132,000 sq ft) athletic facility features a 11.0 by 9.1 metres (36 by 30 ft) indoor rock climbing wall, Olympic weightlifting equipment, four internationally sized squash courts, and a four-lane 200 metres (660 ft) indoor track.

== History ==
The athletic centre was opened by McMaster University in 2007. The cost to build the facility was approximately C$31 million, with C$20 million originating from the university's student unions.

In 2018 the athletic centre was involved in an unsuccessful litigation filed by a former student for an alleged injury from using the facility. In May 2018, a jury panel of the Ontario Superior Court of Justice found the university not liable for any claims, with the decision later upheld by the Ontario Court of Appeal.

The indoor track was closed for construction in 2018 and scheduled to be reopened in 2020.

== Curiosity ==
Some scenes from the Canadian series Heated Rivalry were filmed in this athletic centre.

== See also ==
- List of sports venues in Hamilton, Ontario
