= USS Mohawk =

USS Mohawk may refer to the following ships of the United States Navy:

- USS Mohawk (1814), a U.S. Navy ship in the War of 1812.
- USS Mohawk (1853), a U.S. Navy screw steamship launched in 1853.
- Mohawk (YT-17), a U.S. Navy tug acquired in 1898.

== See also ==
- USRC Mohawk (1904), a U.S. Revenue cutter launched in 1904.
- USCGC Mohawk, ships of the U.S. Coast Guard
- USNS Mohawk (T-ATF-170), a U.S. Navy reserve fleet ocean tug launched in 1980.
