= LIUNA 4 Ice Centre =

Recreation complex in Hamilton, Ontario

- "The Quad"
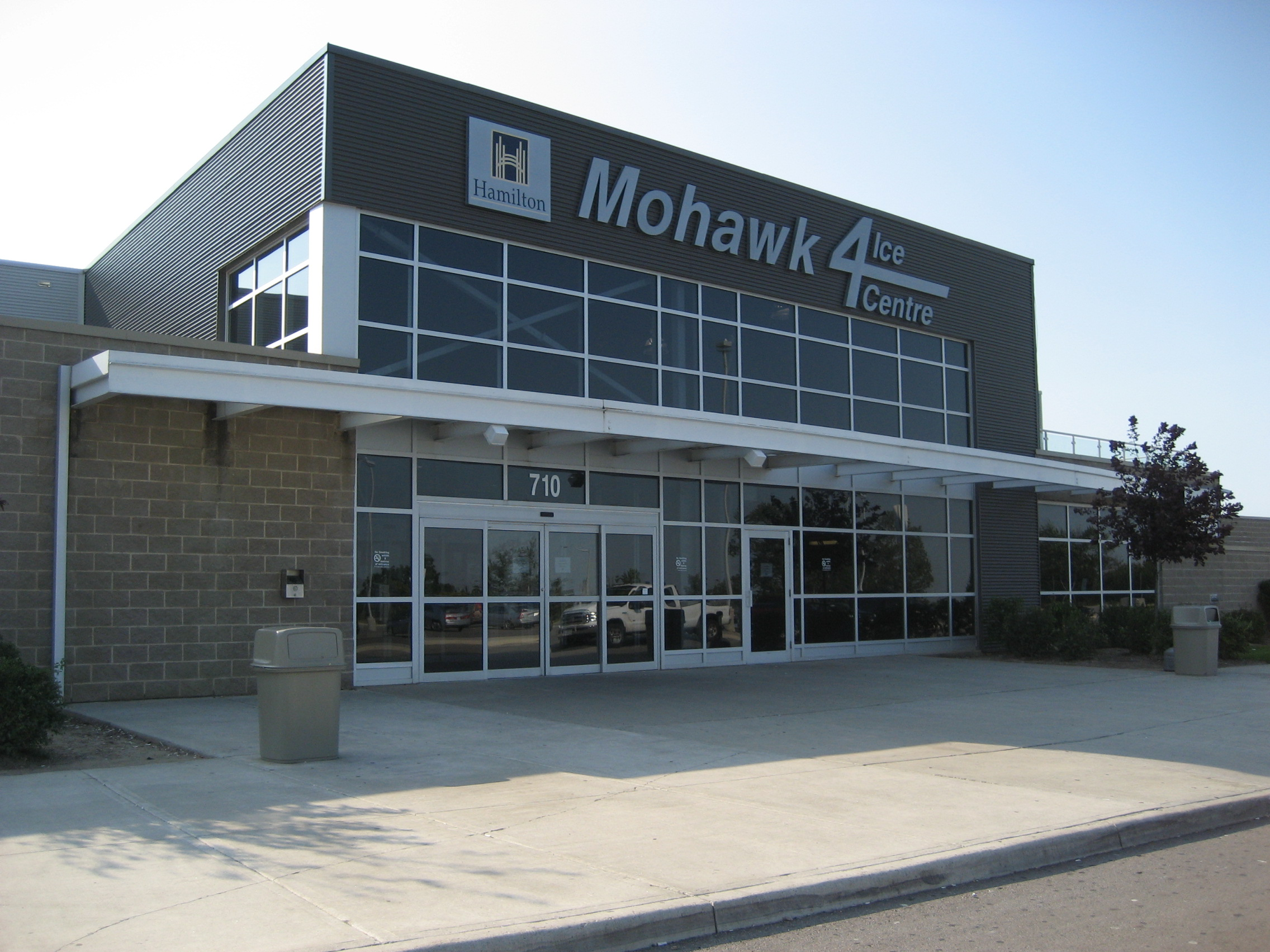
- LIUNA 4 Ice Centre (then Mohawk 4 Ice Centre) in 2008
- Interactive map of LIUNA 4 Ice Centre
- Former names: Mohawk 4 Ice Centre (2005–2025)
- Address: 710 Mountain Brow Boulevard; Hamilton, Ontario; Canada
- Coordinates: 43.20949°N 79.81706°W
- Owner: City of Hamilton
- Operator: Nustadia Recreation
- Type: Recreation complex

Construction
- Opened: January 2005
- Years active: 2005–present
- Builder: Hamilton Arena Partners

Tenants
- Stoney Creek Oldtimers Hockey Association; Civic Employees Hockey League; Nustadia Recreational Hockey League; Hamilton Steel Hockey Club

Website
- liuna4icecentre.ca

LIUNA 4 Ice Centre (stylized as LiUNA!) is an ice sports recreation complex located in Mohawk Sports Park on Mountain Brow Boulevard near Mohawk Road East in Hamilton, Ontario, Canada.

At over 136,000 square feet (12,600 m^{2}), LIUNA 4 Ice Centre includes 4 NHL-sized ice pads, a total of twenty-four change rooms, a large multi-purpose room, sports retail outlet, offices, administration and food and beverage facilities on both floors. A conservative estimate of attendance in a single season of use for the ice centre is over 1,500,000 attendees.

It is also the home of the Stoney Creek Oldtimers Hockey Association, Hamilton Junior Bulldogs and the Civic Employees Hockey League. It is also the home of Nustadia Recreational Hockey League and the Hamilton Steel Hockey Club.

The arena is considered to be the premier skating and hockey training facility of the city. A number of workshops are held there and these include; Pro Hockey Life Academy, and a number of power skating programs, Velenosi Powerskating, and Kelly Reed Hockey A number of Hamilton area NHL and pro hockey players use the facility for off-season training.

In 2025, the ice centre was renamed after the Laborers' International Union of North America.

== Images ==
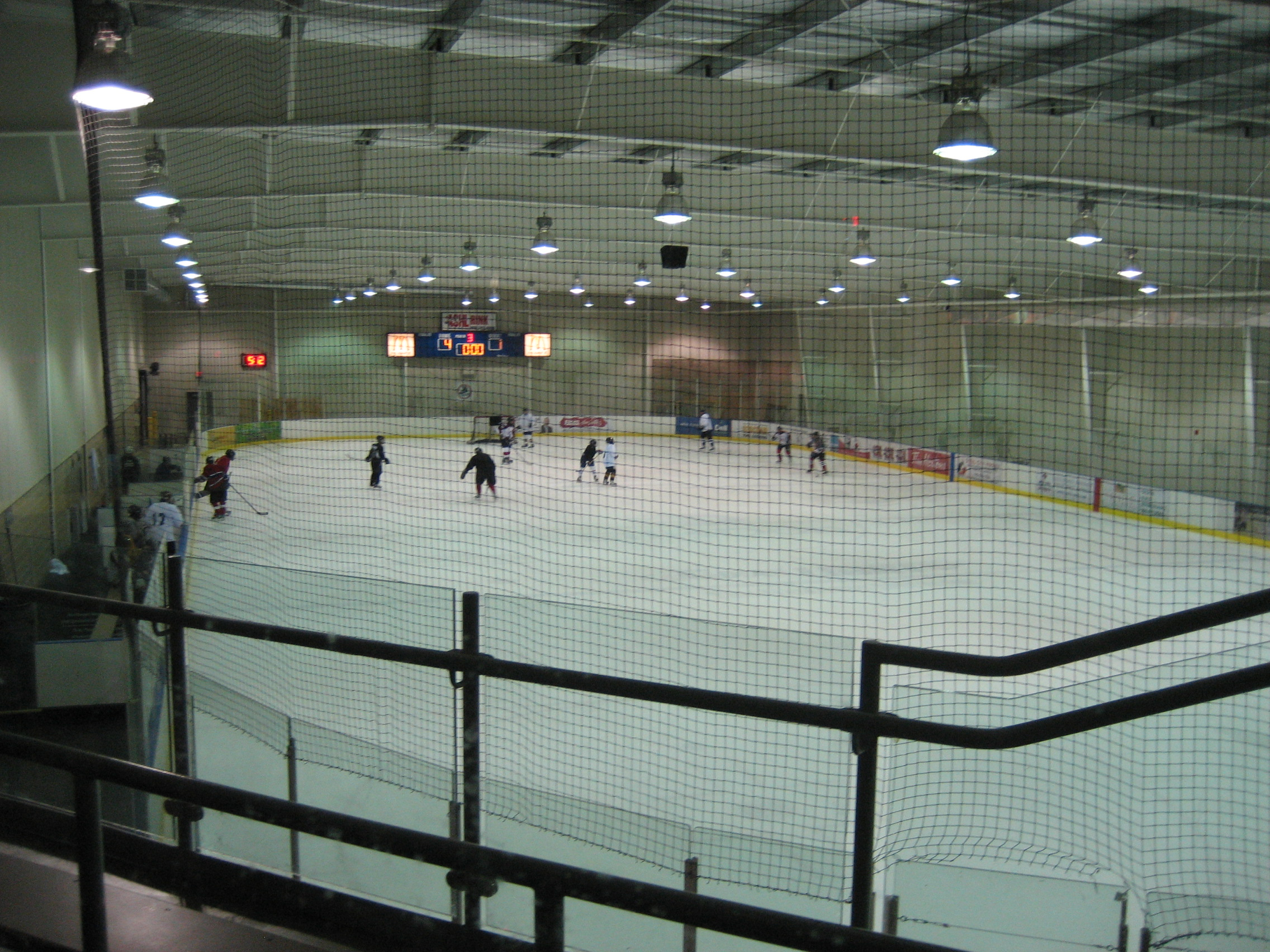
View from 2nd floor lounge

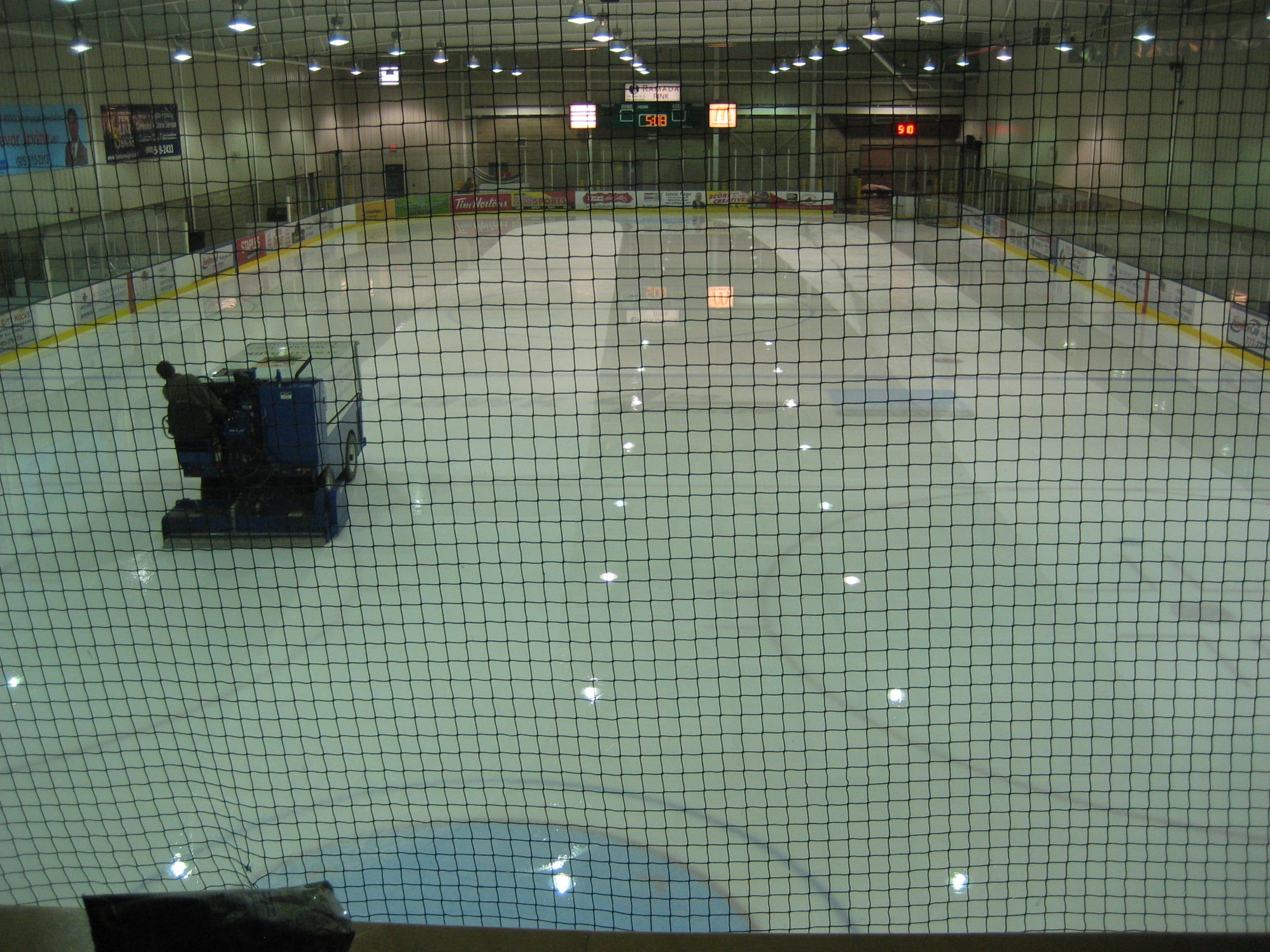
View from 2nd floor lounge

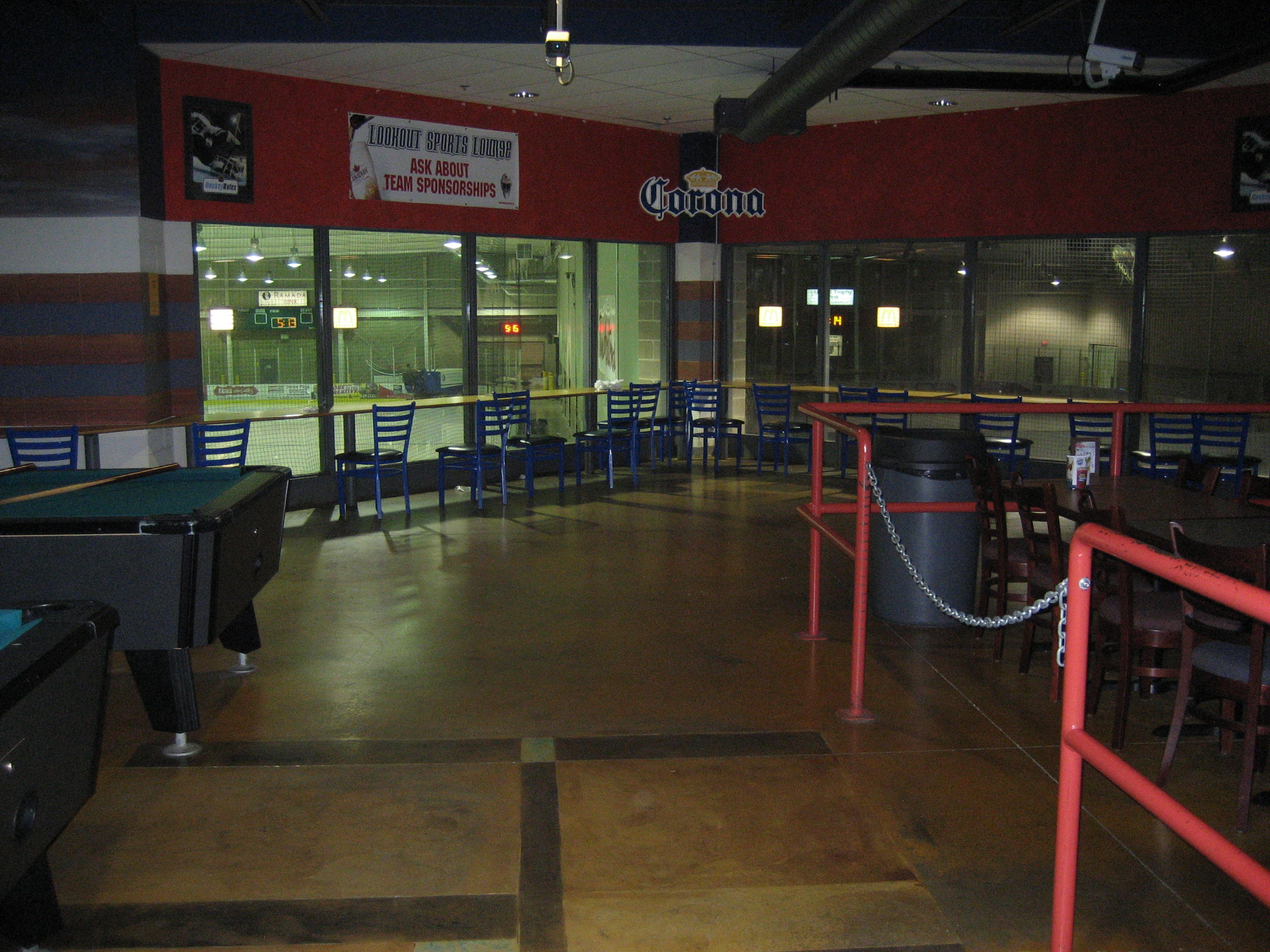
Lookout Lounge

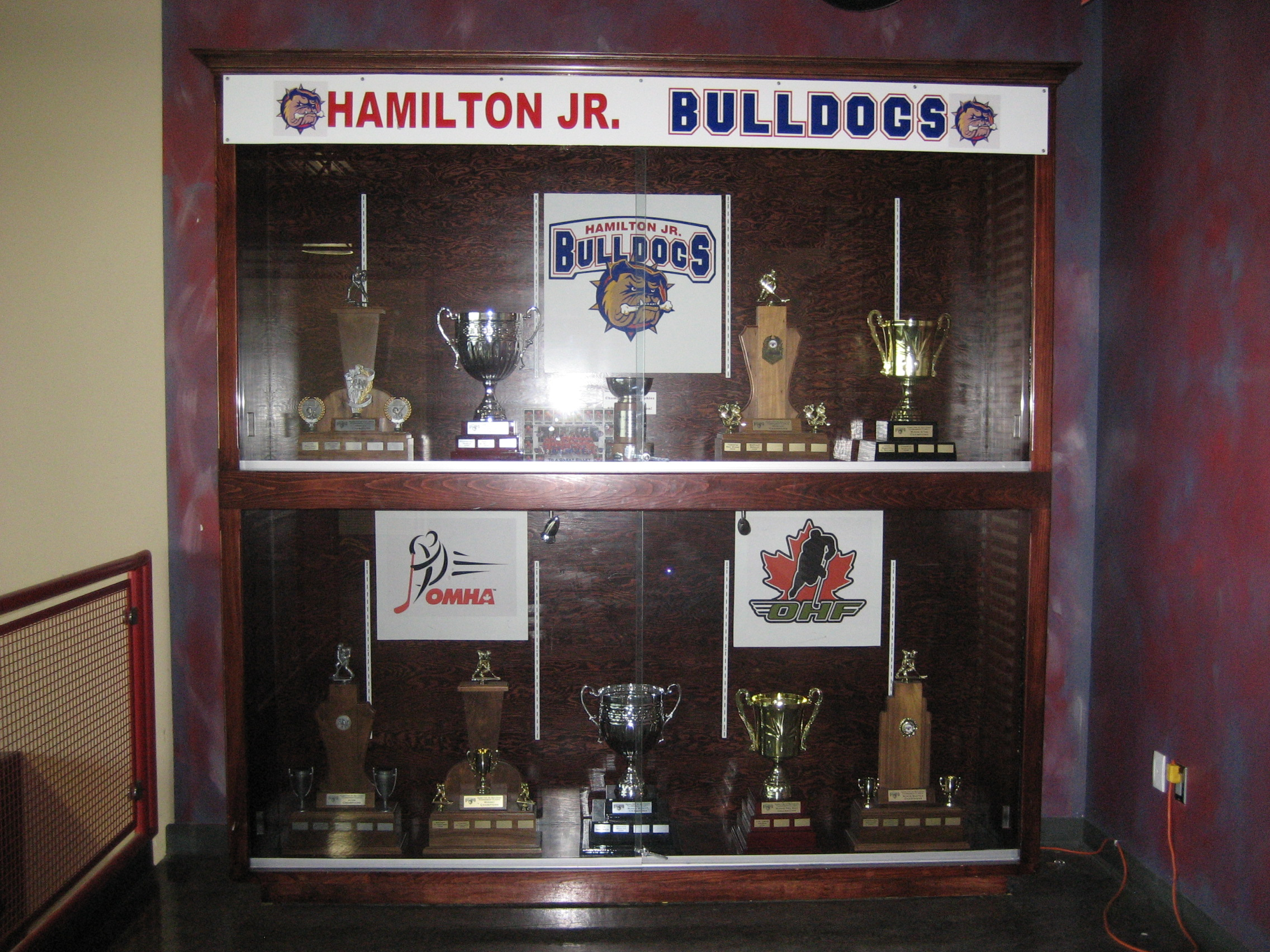
Hamilton Junior Bulldogs trophy case

== See also ==
- List of sports venues in Hamilton, Ontario
