= Mohawk Commons =

Coordinates: 42.77450°N 73.89247°W

- Location: Niskayuna, New York, United States
- Opened: 2002
- Developer: Myron M. Hunt, Inc., and Benderson Development Corp.
- Manager: DLC Management
- Owner: DLC Management
- Num. of stores: 20+
- Floor area: 540,000 sq ft (50,000 m^{2})
- Floors: 1

Mohawk Commons is a lifestyle center in Niskayuna, New York. It opened in 2002 and replaced the older enclosed Mohawk Mall previously located on the property.

== Anchor stores ==
- Marshalls
- Target

== Ownership ==
The property, including the largely empty Mohawk Mall, was purchased from Wilmorite Properties in June 2000, by Myron M. Hunt and Benderson Development Co. from Buffalo, New York

In mid-2004, Developers Diversified Realty of Cleveland purchased the center from Benderson Development Corporation. At the time, Developers Diversified Realty was in the process of purchasing over 100 shopping centers across the United States. In 2016, a joint venture consisting of DLC Management Corporation and DRA Advisors LLC purchased Mohawk Commons as part of the acquisition of a shopping center portfolio of 16 properties, consisting of 4.85 million square feet.

The property was sold to DLC Management Corp. in December 2016.
