= Mohawk Sports Park =

Large sports park in Hamilton, Ontario

- Interactive map of Mohawk Sports Park
- Location: 1100 Mohawk Road East, Hamilton, Ontario, Canada
- Coordinates: 43.209°N 79.820°W
- Owner: City of Hamilton
- Facilities: Bernie Arbour Memorial Stadium; LIUNA 4 Ice Centre

Mohawk Sports Park is a large sports park on the East mountain of Hamilton, Ontario. Located at 1100 Mohawk Road East, the park features a number of venues and amenities.

== History ==
This park was formerly known as Upper King's Forest Sports Park and as Commonwealth Park. In 1971, the park was known as Mohawk Sports Park. The park is widely considered to be the city's top sports facility.

In 1970, the civic baseball stadium was relocated to the site. On June 30, 1971, it was officially named Bernie Arbour Memorial Stadium to honour Bernie Arbour, a former Hamilton police sergeant who directed the local police minor sports association.

== Facilities ==
A number of sporting venues including:

- 8 lane dedicated competition track and field facility
- 7 baseball fields including Bernie Arbour Memorial Stadium
- LIUNA 4 Ice Centre, 4 NHL-sized ice pads

== See also ==
- List of sports venues in Hamilton, Ontario
