= Mohawk Mall =

- Location: Niskayuna, New York, United States
- Coordinates: 42°46′19″N 73°53′32.1″W
- Opened: October 5, 1970
- Closed: 2000 (demolished 2000–spring 2001; 2002 for Marshalls)
- Developer: Stanford Associates
- Owner: Myron M. Hunt, Inc., and Benderson Development Corp.
- Num. of stores: 88
- Num. of anchor tenants: 3
- Floor area: 750,000 sq ft (70,000 m^{2})
- Floors: 1 (store which housed Boston Store and later Addis and Dey's had two floors)
- Parking: 4,000

Mohawk Mall was an enclosed shopping mall in the town of Niskayuna, New York, on a 50-acre (200,000 m^{2}) parcel located at the corner of State Street and Balltown Road. It was managed by Genesee Management. It had three courts with groups of fountains and seating areas. The mall was first opened in 1970 and mostly demolished in 2000, with its last remaining section demolished in 2002. The property has been redeveloped into Mohawk Commons, a lifestyle center.

== History ==
=== Development ===
Before becoming a shopping mall, the property was the Stanford Golf Course.

The mall cost $25 million to build. It was constructed by Stanford Associates and designed by Evantash-Friedman Associates of Philadelphia. The parking lot had space for 4,000 vehicles. Local leasing was handled by Frank J. Nigro Realty of Albany, NY.

According to Lewis M. Stone of Pan American Development Corp., it was the first mall in the nation to have the "mini-mall" concept, setting aside 9,000 square feet (840 m^{2}) for approximately fifteen to twenty boutiques representing major metropolitan areas. It would also cater to small businesses. This section was included in the southwest portion of the mall.

=== Opening ===
The mall opened its doors on October 5, 1970, with authentic Native American dances and ceremonies and 10,000 free toys and balloons. An invocation was scheduled to be given by the Rev. Darwin Kirby of St. George's Episcopal Church.

Tenants that signed leases prior to the opening of the mall included anchors Montgomery Ward; Boston Store (84,000 sq ft.), which losed on August 19, 1990; and J.M. Fields, replaced by Bradlees; It also opened with the second McDonald's store to be located in a mall.

Montgomery Ward opened August 26, 1970, consisting of 160,000 square feet. The Boston Store opened in the mall on October 5, 1970. The 80,000-square-foot (7,400 m^{2}) space used by this store was the only two-story space in the mall. At the time, it had fifty departments and expected to employ 200 people with an annual payroll of one million dollars.

=== Later tenants ===
In the last half of 1976, Golub Corp. acquired the lease for the former Pantry Pride store which closed in May, 1976. Golub Corp. opened a Price Chopper grocery store in the mall. The Golub Corp. closed its Price Chopper store in the mall in January, 1987, due to the "supercenter" being built in the neighboring town of Colonie.

In September, 1990, Addis and Dey's purchased the Mohawk Mall Boston Store. Addis & Dey's held a going out of business sale at this location and the Wilton Mall at Saratoga in December, 1992.

Marshall's became a tenant of Mohawk Mall around 1992, leaving Marshall's Plaza, the strip mall next door which bore its name.

=== Decline ===
In 1985, a strip mall called Marshall's Plaza, was built next to Mohawk Mall. (The signature tenant, Marshall's, would eventually leave the plaza and move into Mohawk Mall.)

The opening of the Rotterdam Square mall in the late 1980s by Wilmorite, Mohawk Mall's primary owners, affected the mall. This was predicted in a federal government study about the retail impact on the area. By October, 1991, 25% of the mall was vacant. Many of the missing tenants moved to Rotterdam Square Mall. Rumors circulated in early 1992 that Addis & Dey's would relocate to Latham Circle Mall to the increasing vacancies at Mohawk Mall. By early 1993, after the closings of Addis & Dey's and Anderson Little, Niskayuna Town Supervisor Edwin Reilly asked mall managers to look for upscale stores and add items such as a food court and more fountains. He complained about the frequent store closings in the mall.

The Niskayuna Square shopping center, only minutes away from Mohawk Mall, was built in the mid-1990s. The strip center contained a Super Shop N' Save supermarket and other stores. This too, put retail pressure on Mohawk Mall.

In May, 1996, then anchor Bradlees announced its store would be closing. Bradlees' closing was completed in November, 1996. Montgomery Wards closed its store at the end of 1997. By early 1998, after Wards' closing, the mall was only 50% occupied. The movie theatres, operated at that point by Loew's Theatres and having seven screens, closed in July, 1999.

Competition from newer, larger area malls such as Crossgates Mall also helped to seal the mall's fate.

=== Tax challenges ===
In 1972, Stanford Associates (owners of the center portion of the mall), sued the Town of Niskayuna to lower the assessment of their portion of the mall. Stanford Associates asked that their portion be returned to the old assessment of $670,000. The South Colonie School Board decided to order a complete appraisal of the property at a school board meeting on October 3, 1972.

In 1990, there were more assessment challenges.

Later in the 1990s, then owner Wilmorite had a four-year legal dispute with the Town of Niskayuna over the mall's assessment. In February 1999, a court ruled in favor of Wilmorite, requiring the town to pay back $104,205. The South Colonie School District was required to refund $481,237.

=== Demolition and redevelopment ===
Mall management considered a mixed use facility such as office space for government and doctors offices in 1998. Area residents, even elementary school children, came up with ideas for repopulating the mall.

The property was purchased from Wilmorite in June, 2000, by Myron M. Hunt and Benderson Development Co. from Buffalo, NY. At the time, the remaining tenants were Marshall's, Media Play, and Rex's TV and Appliances. Demolition of the unoccupied portions of the old Mohawk Mall was completed by Spring, 2001. It was expected that all three remaining stores would be located in the new strip mall power center. However, Rex and Media Play closed during construction. Media Play closed on September 9, 2001.) Owners of the Rex TV & Appliance store complained about the difficulty customers had finding their store during construction. They closed in mid to late February, 2002, and began searching for a new location in the Schenectady area. Marshall's remained open throughout construction, with its store space in the back of the old mall's midsection. Customers had to walk through the former Media Play store in order to go to the Marshall's store.

On April 25, 2002, Marshall's reopened in a new 30,010-square-foot (2,788 m2) space, being the only store from the old mall to transfer to new retail space. The building housing the old Marshall's store and former Media Play store would be demolished later in the year to make way for additional construction.

== Ownership ==
In 1972, the (Troy) Times Record referred to Stanford Associates as the owner of the "middle of the mall". In 1976, the mall was purchased by Balcor Realty Investors, Ltd. In 1983, Wilmorite purchased the center section of the mall, owning 23.9 acres (97,000 m^{2}). In 1998, The Albany Business Journal listed Wilmorite as the owner of the center of the mall in a division called Mohawk Mall Associates, while indicating the space formerly housing Montgomery Wards was owned by a Chicago real estate company and the space housing the former Bradlees store was owned by American Real Estate Holdings Ltd. Partners.

== Events ==
On October 17, 1987, astronaut Donald Slayton appeared at the mall for its 17th anniversary where he spoke to a crowd of children.

After Thanksgiving in 1986, children at the mall found out that Santa Claus was not real when the man pretending to be Santa Claus had a heart attack and died in front of them.

In 1985 the Pepsi Challenge came to the mall.

On February 10, 1991, crew from ABC's America's Funniest People were at the center court (between Addis & Dey's and the empty former Flah's store) from 11 am to 4 pm to search for potential contestants.
