= Chedoke Twin Pad Arena =

Recreation complex in Hamilton, Ontario, Canada

Coordinates: 43.238743°N 79.920704°W

Chedoke Twin Pad Arena is a city-owned recreation complex in Hamilton, Ontario, Canada. It includes two ice rinks, as well as meeting rooms. It is also the home of the Chedoke Minor Hockey League, the Hamilton Huskies Associations, and Hamilton Sledge Hockey.
