= Burlington City Council =

Governing body of Burlington, Ontario

- Coat of arms of Burlington

Type
- Type: Lower-tier city council

Leadership
- Mayor (head of council): Marianne Meed Ward since December 1, 2018
- Chair of Council: rotating

Structure
- Seats: 7 (incl. mayor)
- Length of term: 4 years
- Authority: Municipal Act

Elections
- Last election: October 26, 2026 (7 seats)

Meeting place
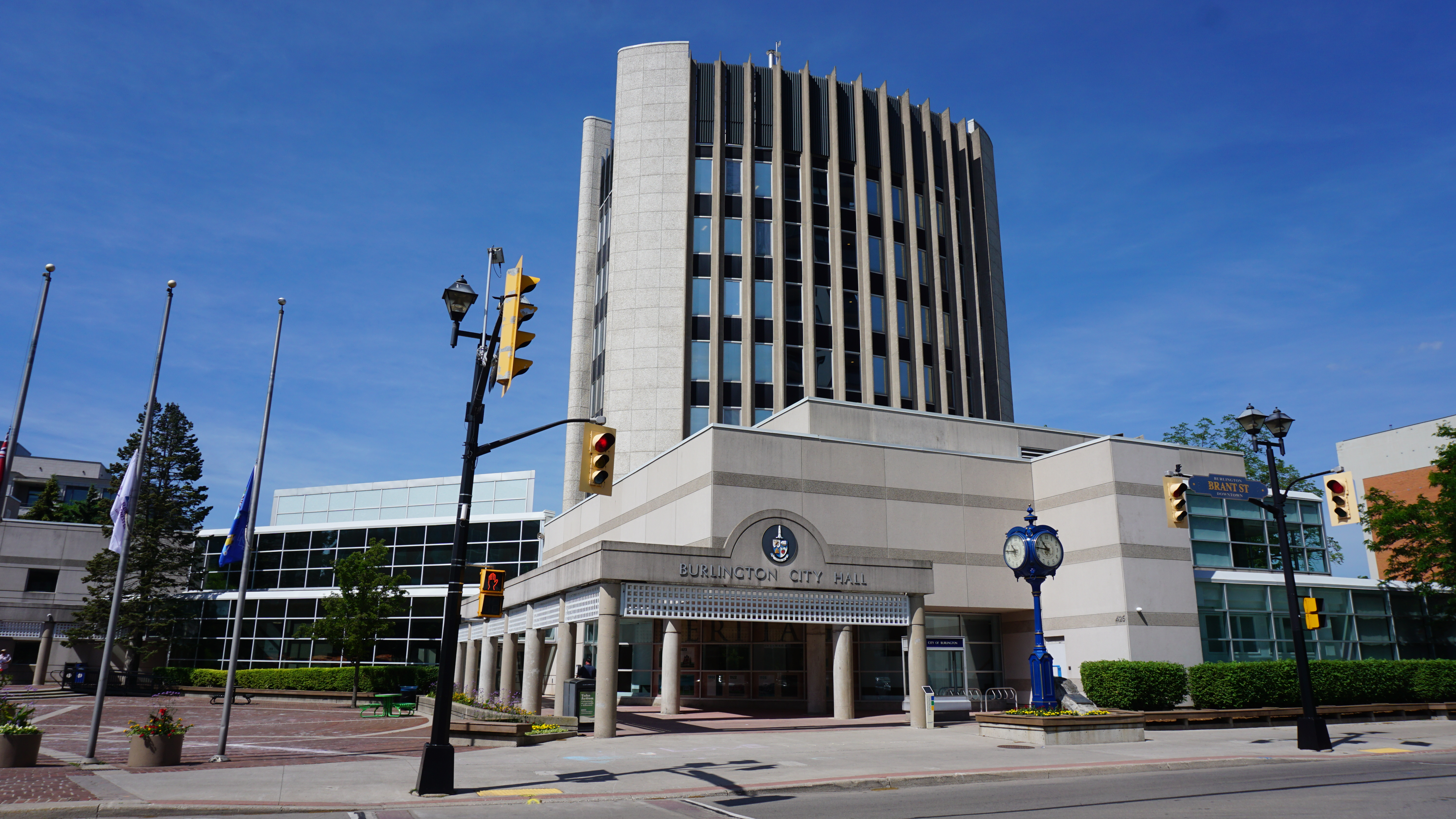
- Burlington City Hall; Burlington, Ontario

Website
- www.burlington.ca/en/council-and-city-administration/council.aspx

Burlington City Council is the governing body of the municipal government of Burlington, Ontario, Canada. The council convenes at Burlington City Hall, and consists of 6 city councillors and the mayor of Burlington. The current term began on November 15, 2026, following the 2026 municipal election.

== Current City Council (2026–2030) ==
Council elected in the 2026 municipal election:

Position	Councillor	Communities
Mayor	Marianne Meed Ward	At-large
Ward 1	Kelvin Galbraith	Aldershot, Tyandaga, Maple, Beachway
Ward 2	Sean Campbell	St Luke's, Freeman, Glenwood Park, Central
Ward 3	Mark Carr	Nelson, Brant Hills, Mountainside, Clarksdale, Kilbride, Lowville, Mount Nemo
Ward 4	Olivia Duke	Dynes, Port Nelson, Roseland, Longmoor, Strathcona Gardens, Shoreacres, Palmer, Tansley
Ward 5	Alex Don	Elizabeth Gardens, Pinedale, Corporate, Orchard
Ward 6	Angelo Bentivegna	Headon Forest, Milcroft, Alton Village

== Council roles ==
Each of the city's six city councillors oversee a specific role for the city of Burlington:

- Deputy Mayor for Business and Red Tape Reduction – Vacant
- Deputy Mayor for Community Engagement and Partnerships – Vacant
- Deputy Mayor for the Environment – Vacant
- Deputy Mayor for Housing – Vacant
- Deputy Mayor for Strategy and Budgets – Vacant
- Deputy Mayor for Recreation and Community Services – Vacant

== Past city councils ==
=== 2022–2026 ===
Council elected in the 2022 municipal election:

- Marianne Meed Ward – Mayor
- Kevin Galbraith – Ward 1
- Lisa Kearns – Ward 2
- Rory Nisan – Ward 3
- Shawna Stolte – Ward 4
- Paul Sharman – Ward 5
- Angelo Bentivegna – Ward 6

=== 2018–2022 ===
Council elected in the 2018 municipal election:

- Marianne Meed Ward – Mayor
- Kevin Galbraith – Ward 1
- Lisa Kearns – Ward 2
- Rory Nisan – Ward 3
- Shawna Stolte – Ward 4
- Paul Sharman – Ward 5
- Angelo Bentivegna – Ward 6

=== 2014–2018 ===
Council elected in the 2014 municipal election:

- Rick Goldring – Mayor
- Rick Craven – Ward 1
- Marianne Meed Ward – Ward 2
- John Taylor – Ward 3
- Jack Dennison – Ward 4
- Paul Sharman – Ward 5
- Blair Lancaster – Ward 6

=== 2010-2014 ===
Council elected in the 2010 municipal election:

- Rick Goldring – Mayor
- Rick Craven – Ward 1
- Marianne Meed Ward – Ward 2
- John Taylor – Ward 3
- Jack Dennison – Ward 4
- Paul Sharman – Ward 5
- Blair Lancaster – Ward 6

=== 2006-2010 ===
Council elected in the 2006 municipal election:

- Cam Jackson – Mayor
- Rick Craven – Ward 1
- Peter Thoem – Ward 2
- John Taylor – Ward 3
- Jack Dennison – Ward 4
- Rick Goldring – Ward 5
- Carol D'Amelio – Ward 6

== See also ==
- Oakville Town Council
