= 2018 Halton Region municipal elections =

Elections in Ontario, Canada

2018 Halton Region municipal election
- October 22, 2018

2018 Halton Regional Chair election
- October 22, 2018
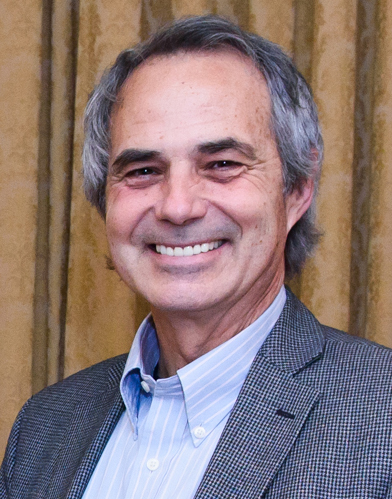
		AM
Candidate	Gary Carr	Anne Marsden
Popular vote	79,775	41,136
Percentage	65.98%	34.02%
Chair before election
Gary Carr
Elected Chair
Gary Carr

Elections were held in the Regional Municipality of Halton of Ontario on October 22, 2018 in conjunction with municipal elections across the province.

== Elected ==
=== Halton Regional Council ===
Position	Elected
Chair
Gary Carr
Burlington
Mayor	Marianne Meed Ward
Councillor, Ward 1	Kelvin Galbraith
Councillor, Ward 2	Lisa Kearns
Councillor, Ward 3	Rory Nisan
Councillor, Ward 4	Shawna Stolte
Councillor, Ward 5	Paul Sharman
Councillor, Ward 6	Angelo Bentivegna
Halton Hills
Mayor	Rick Bonnette
Regional Councillor, Wards 1 & 2	Clark Somerville
Regional Councillor, Wards 3 & 4	Jane Fogal
Milton
Mayor	Gord Krantz
Regional Councillor, Ward 1	Colin Best
Regional Councillor, Ward 2	Rick Malboeuf
Regional Councillor, Ward 3	Mike Cluett
Regional Councillor, Ward 4	Zeeshan Hamid
Oakville
Mayor	Rob Burton
Regional Councillor, Ward 1	Sean O'Meara
Regional Councillor, Ward 2	Cathy Duddeck
Regional Councillor, Ward 3	Dave Gittings
Regional Councillor, Ward 4	Allan Elgar
Regional Councillor, Ward 5	Jeff Knoll
Regional Councillor, Ward 6	Tom Adams
Regional Councillor, Ward 7	Pavan Parmar

== Results ==
=== Halton Regional Chair ===
The following are the results for the position of Halton Regional Chair.

Candidate	Vote	%
Gary Carr (X)	79,775	65.98
Anne Marsden	41,136	34.02

=== Burlington ===
The following are the results for Burlington.

==== Mayor ====
Candidate	Vote	%
Marianne Meed Ward	23,360	46.04
Rick Goldring (X)	16,781	33.08
Mike Wallace	9,609	18.94
Greg Woodruff	983	1.94

==== Regional & City Councillors ====
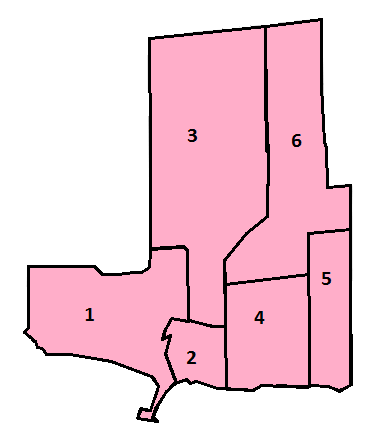
Map of Burlington's six wards

Six Regional & City Councillors were elected in 1 of 6 wards on Burlington City Council.

Candidate	Vote	%
Ward 1
Kelvin Galbraith	1,880	21.36
Judy Worsley	1,443	16.39
Marty Staz	1,242	14.11
Arlene Iantomasi	1,142	12.97
Kevin Lee	838	9.52
Jason Boelhouwer	679	7.71
Vince Fiorito	574	6.52
Rene Papin	556	6.32
Andrew Jordan	199	2.26
Garry Milne	164	1.86
Tayler Morin	86	0.98
Ward 2
Lisa Kearns	3,195	39.77
Roland Tanner	2,058	25.62
Kimberly Calderbank	1,711	21.30
Michael Jones	781	9.72
Walter Wiebe	216	2.69
Gerard Shkuda	73	0.91
Ward 3
Rory Nisan	3,467	54.05
Gareth Williams	1,451	22.62
Lisa Cooper	764	11.91
Darcy Hutzel	542	8.45
Peter Rusin	191	2.98
Ward 4
Shawna Stolte	5,828	55.76
Jack Dennison (X)	4,624	44.24
Ward 5
Paul Sharman (X)	2,840	33.99
Wendy Moraghan	2,336	27.96
Mary St. James	1,471	17.61
Daniel Roukema	1,319	15.79
Xin Zhang	389	4.66
Ward 6
Angelo Bentivegna	2,747	35.73
Blair Lancaster (X)	2,708	35.22
Ken White	1,279	16.64
Kinsey Schurm	954	12.41

=== Halton Hills ===
The following are the results for Halton Hills.

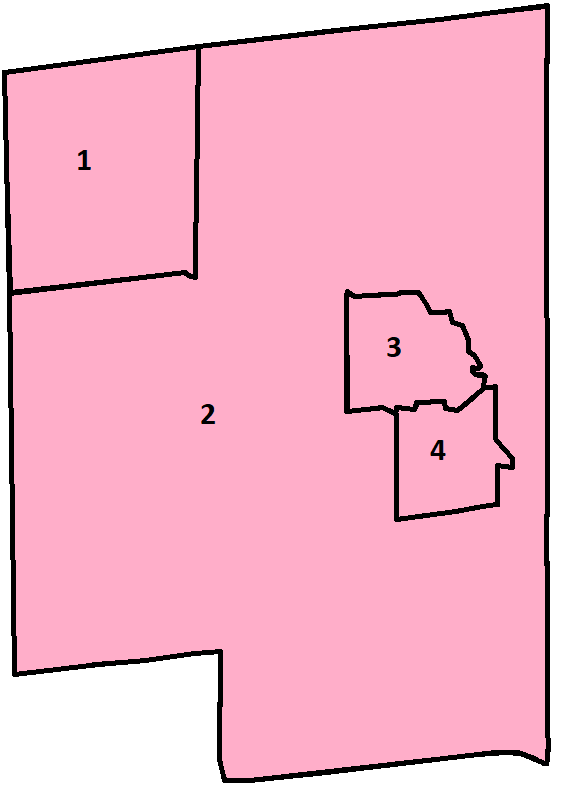
Map of Halton Hills wards

==== Mayor ====
Candidate	Vote	%
Rick Bonnette (X)	10,108	80.35
Robert Gottardi	1,864	14.82
James Waldbusser	608	4.83

The results for Halton Hills Town Council are as follows:

==== Regional Councillors ====
Two Regional Councillors were elected in 1 of 2 wards.

Candidate	Vote	%
Wards 1 & 2
Clark Somerville (X)	Acclaimed	
Wards 3 & 4
Jane Fogal (X)	4,840	62.02
John Cooke	1,871	23.97
Mark Lockwood	1,093	14.01

==== Local Councillors ====
Eight Local Councillors were elected in 1 of 4 wards (2 from each ward).

Candidate	Vote	%
Ward 1
Jon Hurst (X)	1,238	28.34
Mike Albano (X)	1,237	28.31
Jamie Adams	824	18.86
Peter Duncanson	604	13.82
Ryan McLaughlin	466	10.67
Ward 2
Ted Brown (X)	1,399	40.87
Bryan Lewis (X)	1,236	36.11
Geoff Maltby	788	23.02
Ward 3
Wendy Farrow-Reed	2,014	31.38
Moya Johnson	1,580	24.29
Dave Kentner (X)	1,331	20.74
Patrick Cryan	878	13.68
Randy Kerman	615	9.58
Ward 4
Ann Lawlor (X)	2,047	26.17
Bob Inglis (X)	1,922	24.57
D'Arcy Keene	1,577	20.16
Kim Roy	1,148	14.67
Ron Norris	761	9.73
Abe Verghis	368	4.70

=== Milton ===
The following are the results for Milton.

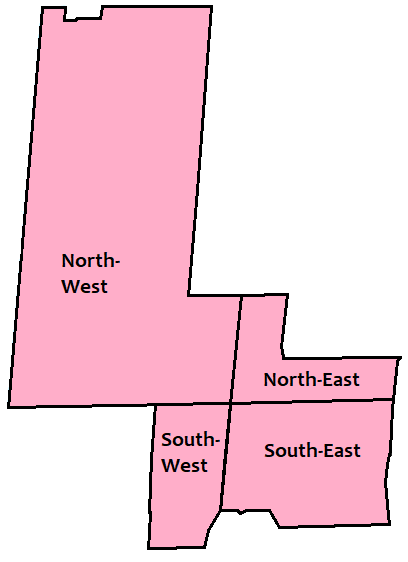
Map of Milton's four wards

For 2018, Milton reduced the number of councillors from 11 to 9. This consequently resulted in 4 Regional Councillors and 4 Local Councillors being elected.

==== Mayor ====
Candidate	Vote	%
Gord Krantz (X)	18,571	81.63
Mian Naeem	2,306	10.14
Wasim Ahmed	1,874	8.24

The results for Milton Town Council are as follows:

==== Regional Councillors ====
Four Regional Councillors were elected in 1 of 4 wards.

Candidate	Vote	%
Ward 1
Colin Best (X)	6,509	92.42
Farooq Azam	392	5.57
Hassu Bihari	142	2.02
Ward 2
Rick Malboeuf	3,817	53.20
Arnold Huffman	1,479	20.61
Falak Shoaib	945	13.17
Aman Hans	934	13.02
Ward 3
Mike Cluett (X)	3,673	81.60
Faisal Elahi	828	18.40
Ward 4
Zeeshan Hamid	2,100	54.47
Sammy Ijaz	687	17.82
John Pollard	548	14.22
Tony Lambert	321	8.33
David Hertzman	199	5.16

==== Local Councillors ====
Four Local Councillors were elected in 1 of 4 wards.

Candidate	Vote	%
Ward 1
Kristina Tesser Derksen	3,457	48.68
Cindy Lunau (X)	2,002	28.19
Chris Jewell	1,208	17.01
Mahmood Chaudhry	435	6.13
Ward 2
John Challinor	2,036	27.92
Galen Naidoo Harris	1,830	25.10
Michael Vertolli	1,539	21.11
Giles Vanderholt	1,112	15.25
Sarah Jensen	710	9.74
Roy Zwolman	65	0.89
Ward 3
Rick Di Lorenzo (X)	2,369	52.08
Robert Duvall (X)	1,705	37.48
Usman Kayani	475	10.44
Ward 4
Sameera Ali	1,767	47.32
Jean Ngansoo	904	24.21
Syed Raza	539	14.43
Biren Gosai	266	7.12
Khurshid Khan	258	6.91

=== Oakville ===
List of candidates:

==== Mayor ====
Mayoral Candidate	Vote	%
Rob Burton (X)	22,918	49.64
Julia Hanna	19,431	42.09
John McLaughlin	3,816	8.27

==== Oakville Town Council ====
The size of Oakville's council has been increased from 13 members to 15 and has necessitated the creation of a seventh ward.

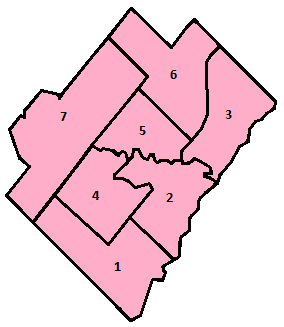
Map of Oakville's wards to be used in this election.

===== Town and Regional Council =====
Candidate	Vote	%
Ward 1
Sean O'Meara (X)	5,925	82.12
Obaro Akpomena	672	9.31
Numair Khan	618	8.57
Ward 2
Cathy Duddeck (X)	Acclaimed	
Ward 3
Dave Gittings (X)	Acclaimed	
Ward 4
Allan Elgar (X)	6,121	73.26
Rob Cottingham	1,134	13.57
Gordon Brennan	1,100	13.17
Ward 5
Jeff Knoll (X)	4,866	62.07
Ann Mulvale	2,752	35.11
Sheena Sandhu	221	2.82
Ward 6
Tom Adams (X)	Acclaimed	
Ward 7
Pavan Parmar	570	27.91
Shahrez Daniyal Hayder	502	24.58
Nav Nanda	491	24.05
Amir Henry	371	18.17
Shahab Khan	108	5.29

===== Town Council =====
Candidate	Vote	%
Ward 1
Beth Robertson	2,795	39.75
Donovan Cox	2,414	34.33
John B. Rishworth	1,051	14.95
June Campbell	772	10.98
Ward 2
Ray Chisholm (X)	3,604	53.58
Fraser Damoff	2,239	33.28
Gordon Zlatko Bobesich	884	13.14
Ward 3
Janet Haslett-Theall	3,040	44.16
Nick Hutchins (X)	2,814	40.88
Vivianne MacKinnon	1,030	14.96
Ward 4
Peter Longo (X)	4,773	55.44
Susan Sheppard	1,658	19.26
Ishrani Henry	880	10.22
Muneezah Jawad	491	5.70
Rohit Dhamija	380	4.41
Michael John Langford	344	4.00
Nauman Waheed	84	0.98
Ward 5
Marc Grant (X)	4,216	57.35
Michael Reid	2,189	29.78
Sushila Pereira	946	12.87
Ward 6
Natalia Lishchyna (X)	Acclaimed	
Ward 7
Jasvinder Sandhu	551	28.14
Saima Zaidi	532	27.17
Adrian Paris	455	23.24
Ajay Rosha	420	21.45
