= 2010 Halton Region municipal elections =

2010 Halton Region municipal election
- October 25, 2010

Elections were held in the Regional Municipality of Halton of Ontario on October 25, 2010, in conjunction with municipal elections across the province.

== Halton Regional Council ==
Regional chair	Vote	%
Gary Carr (X)	Acclaimed	

Position	Elected
Burlington mayor	Rick Goldring
Burlington Ward 1	Rick Craven
Burlington Ward 2	Marianne Meed Ward
Burlington Ward 3	John Taylor
Burlington Ward 4	Jack Dennison
Burlington Ward 5	Paul Sharman
Burlington Ward 6	Blair Lancaster
Halton Hills Mayor	Rick Bonnette
Halton Hills Wards 1 & 2	Clark A. Somerville
Halton Hills Wards 3 & 4	Jane Fogal
Milton Mayor	Gord Krantz
Milton South	Tony Lambert
Milton North	Colin Best
Oakville Mayor	Rob Burton
Oakville Ward 1	Alan Johnston
Oakville Ward 2	Cathy Duddeck
Oakville Ward 3	F. Keith Bird
Oakville Ward 4	Allan Elgar
Oakville Ward 5	Jeff Knoll
Oakville Ward 6	Tom Adams

== Burlington ==
Mayoral Candidate	Vote	%
Rick Goldring	21,728	48.05
Carol D'Amelio	11,275	24.87
Cam Jackson (X)	10,035	22.14
Philip Papadopoulos	2,068	4.58
Ernest Otieno	172	0.38

== Halton Hills ==
Mayoral Candidate	Vote	%
Rick Bonnette (X)	Acclaimed	

== Milton ==
Mayoral Candidate	Vote	%
Gord Krantz (X)	9,262	59.79
Gerry Marsh	3,721	24.02
Al Volpe	1,355	8.75
Qadeer Shah	1,153	7.44

== Oakville ==
2010 Oakville Town election - Mayor
Mayoral Candidate	Vote	%
Rob Burton (X)	25,107	52.28%
Ann Mulvale	20,269	42.21%
John McLaughlin	2,083	4.34%
Raymond Ray	563	1.17%
