= 2026 Halton Region municipal elections =

Canadian municipal elections

- October 26, 2026

Elections were held in the Regional Municipality of Halton in Ontario on October 26, 2026, in conjunction with municipal elections across the province.

(X) denotes incumbency

== Halton Regional Council ==
Halton Regional Council consists of the chair (appointed by the provincial government), eight members of Oakville Town Council, seven members of Burlington City Council, five members of Milton Town Council and three members of Halton Hills Town Council.

| Position | Elected |
Chair
Appointed by provincial government
Burlington
| Mayor | Marianne Meed Ward |
| Councillor, Ward 1 | Kelvin Galbraith |
| Councillor, Ward 2 | Sean Campbell |
| Councillor, Ward 3 | Mark Carr |
| Councillor, Ward 4 | Olivia Duke |
| Councillor, Ward 5 | Alex Don |
| Councillor, Ward 6 | Angelo Bentivegna |
Halton Hills
| Mayor | Jason Brass |
| Regional Councillor, Wards 1 & 2 | Hillary Spurr |
| Regional Councillor, Wards 3 & 4 | Chantal Garneau |
Milton
| Mayor | George Minakakis |
| Regional Councillor, Ward 1 | Colin Best |
| Regional Councillor, Ward 2 | John Challinor |
| Regional Councillor, Ward 3 | Rick Di Lorenzo |
| Regional Councillor, Ward 4 | Sarah Marshall |
Oakville
| Mayor | Jeff Knoll |
| Regional Councillor, Ward 1 | Jonathan McNeice |
| Regional Councillor, Ward 2 | Stacey Saunders |
| Regional Councillor, Ward 3 | Janet Haslett-Theall |
| Regional Councillor, Ward 4 | Roger Lapworth |
| Regional Councillor, Ward 5 | Mackenzie Grant |
| Regional Councillor, Ward 6 | Tom Adams |
| Regional Councillor, Ward 7 | Nav Nanda |

== Chair ==
Following the passage of the "Better Regional Governance Act", the provincial government will appoint the chair of the Region. The position had previously been elected by popular vote.

== Burlington ==
List of candidates:

=== Mayor ===
2026 Burlington mayoral election
- October 26, 2026
- Turnout: 35.5% ▲
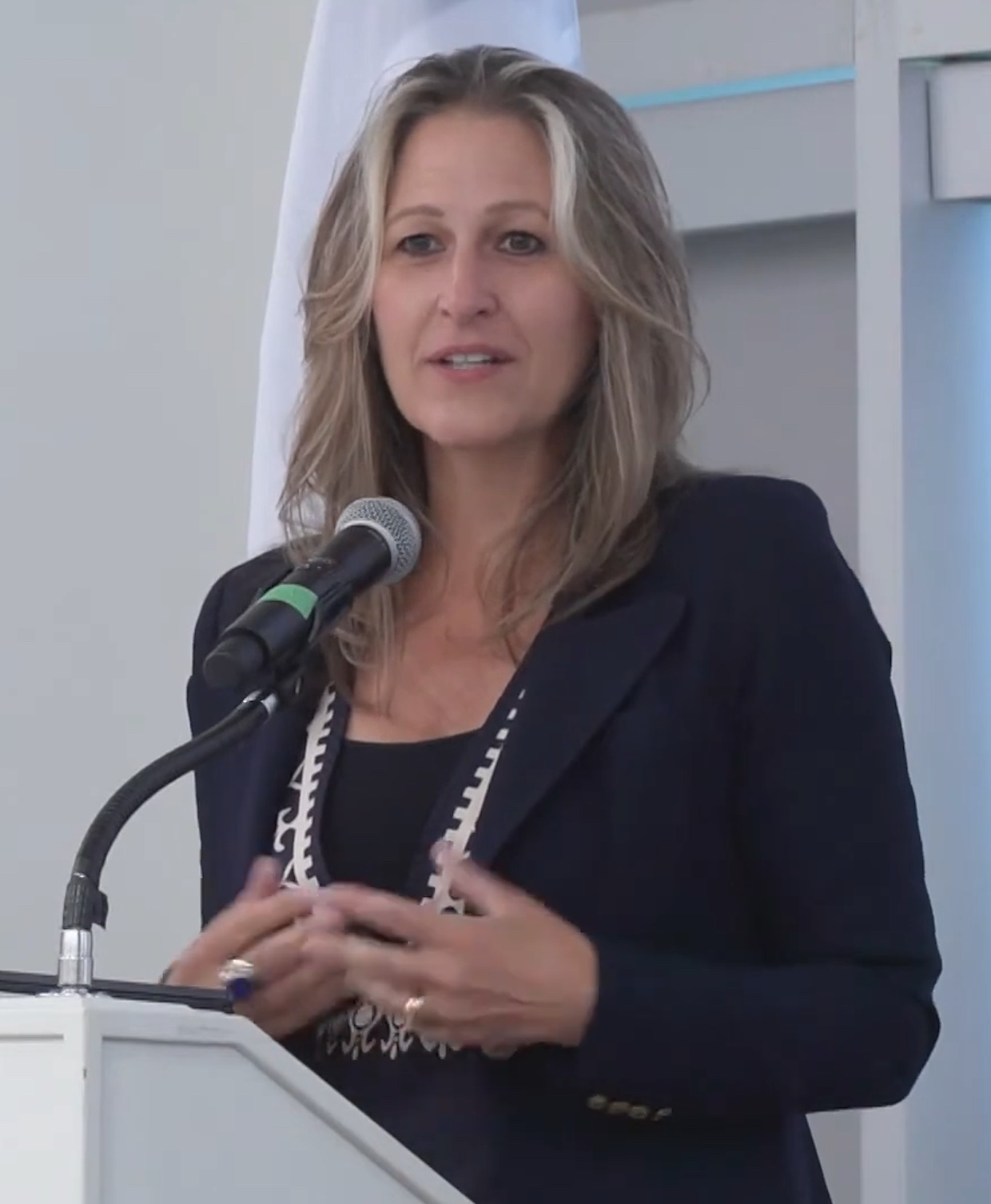
| | | LK | RN |
| Candidate | Marianne Meed Ward | Lisa Kearns | Rory Nisan |
| Popular vote | 25,025 | 17,070 | 12,650 |
| Percentage | 44.00% | 30.02% | 22.25% |
Mayor before election
Marianne Meed Ward
Elected mayor
Marianne Meed Ward

Incumbent mayor Marianne Meed Ward announced on June 3 that she will be running for re-election. Other front-runners included Ward 2 councillor Lisa Kearns, Ward 3 councillor Rory Nisan, and paramedic, business owner and chef Yugalkeesor Ramdhonee.

The incumbent Marianne Meed Ward was re-elected for a third term.

| Candidate | Vote | % |
|---|---|---|
| Marianne Meed Ward (X) | 25,025 | 44.00 |
| Lisa Kearns | 17,070 | 30.02 |
| Rory Nisan | 12,650 | 22.25 |
| Keith Demoe | 1,474 | 2.59 |
| Yugalkeesor Ramdhonee | 273 | 0.48 |

=== Regional and city councillors ===
Map of Burlington's six wards used in this election

Burlington altered its ward boundaries after a review in 2025.

| Candidate | Vote | % |
Ward 1
| Kelvin Galbraith (X) | 3,684 | 48.01 |
| James Kerr | 1,575 | 20.52 |
| Robert Radway | 1,513 | 19.72 |
| Cheryl Hurst | 902 | 11.75 |
Ward 2
| Sean Campbell | 2,967 | 33.44 |
| Gary Carr | 2,862 | 32.26 |
| Masha Brar | 2,273 | 25.62 |
| Jeremy Gaetan | 770 | 8.68 |
Ward 3
| Mark Carr | 2,851 | 30.15 |
| Tony Brecknock | 2,588 | 27.37 |
| Katy Moore | 1,516 | 16.03 |
| Lisa Cooper | 1,450 | 15.33 |
| Kyle Hutton | 1,051 | 11.11 |
Ward 4
| Olivia Duke | 4,669 | 52.27 |
| Chris Carter | 4,264 | 47.73 |
Ward 5
| Alex Don | 3,360 | 33.20 |
| Paul Sharman (X) | 3,172 | 31.34 |
| Kristy Dickinson | 2,862 | 28.28 |
| Brian Machan | 728 | 7.19 |
Ward 6
| Angelo Bentivegna (X) | 3,603 | 34.72 |
| Frank Domenic | 3,073 | 29.62 |
| Chris Bouchard | 1,702 | 16.40 |
| Bianca Bielski | 823 | 7.93 |
| Osob Adus | 805 | 7.76 |
| Rowen Fraser | 274 | 2.64 |
| Edmond Jodhi | 96 | 0.93 |

== Halton Hills ==
2026 Halton Hills mayoral election
- October 26, 2026
| | JB | AL | IB |
| Candidate | Jason Brass | Ann Lawlor | Ivan Bosjnak |
| Popular vote | 9,574 | 5,202 | 2,404 |
| Percentage | 55.7% | 30.3% | 14.0% |
Mayor before election
Ann Lawlor
Elected mayor
Jason Brass

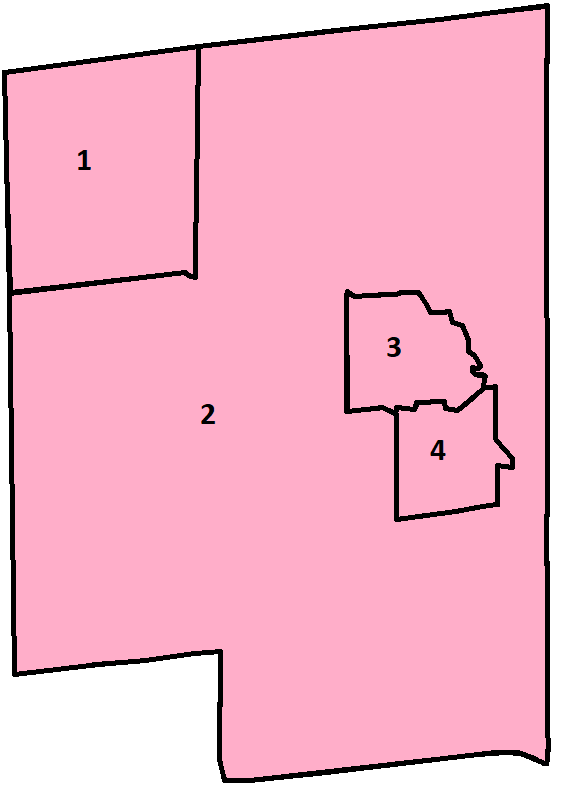
Map of Halton Hills' four wards.

List of candidates:

=== Mayor ===
Mayor Ann Lawlor ran for re-election, challenged by Ward 2 Councillor Jason Brass, and construction professional Ivan Bosjnak.

Councillor Brass defeated Mayor Lawlor with 55.7% of the vote.

| Candidate | Vote | % |
|---|---|---|
| Jason Brass | 9,574 | 55.73 |
| Ann Lawlor (X) | 5,202 | 30.28 |
| Ivan Bosjnak | 2,404 | 13.99 |

=== Regional councillors ===
Two Regional Councillors are elected to represent two wards on the Halton Regional Council. Regional Councillors also sit on Halton Hills Town Council.

Regional Councillors Clark Somerville and Jane Fogal retired.

Hillary Spurr defeated Ward 1 Councillor Alex Hilson with 52.9% of the vote.

Ward 3 Councillor Chantal Garneau defeated Ward 4 Councillor D'Arcy Keene with 50.7% of the vote.

| Candidate | Vote | % |
Wards 1 & 2
| Hillary Spurr | 2,894 | 52.91 |
| Alex Hilson | 2,576 | 47.09 |
Wards 3 & 4
| Chantal Garneau | 5,716 | 50.74 |
| D'Arcy Keene | 5,549 | 49.26 |

=== Town councillors ===
Eight Town Councillors are elected in four wards, with the candidates who place first and second in a ward being elected by plurality.

Councillor Jason Brass stood down to run for Mayor.

Councillors Chantal Garneau, Alex Hilson, and D'Arcy Keene stood down to run for Regional Council.

| Candidate | Vote | % |
Ward 1
| Mike Albano (X) | 1,608 | 32.37 |
| Shanna Maltby | 1,244 | 25.05 |
| Kevin Carruthers | 1,144 | 23.03 |
| Anthony Galati | 971 | 19.55 |
Ward 2
| Matt Kindbom (X) | 1,812 | 42.54 |
| Ken Paige | 1,115 | 26.17 |
| Daniel Dragicevic | 961 | 22.56 |
| Jasvir Sodhi | 372 | 8.73 |
Ward 3
| Ron Norris (X) | 2,430 | 29.46 |
| Anita Bergsma | 2,341 | 28.38 |
| Wendy Farrow-Reed | 2,018 | 24.46 |
| Maeve Sharkey | 1,460 | 17.70 |
Ward 4
| Kimberley Roy | 3,072 | 27.27 |
| Bob Inglis (X) | 3,014 | 26.75 |
| Tyler McFadden | 1,606 | 14.26 |
| Waldo Paquette | 1,129 | 10.02 |
| Aditee Goswami | 902 | 8.01 |
| Hardeep Ghuman | 737 | 6.54 |
| Christopher Power | 547 | 4.86 |
| Seema Tunio | 259 | 2.30 |

== Milton ==
List of candidates:

=== Mayor ===
2026 Milton mayoral election
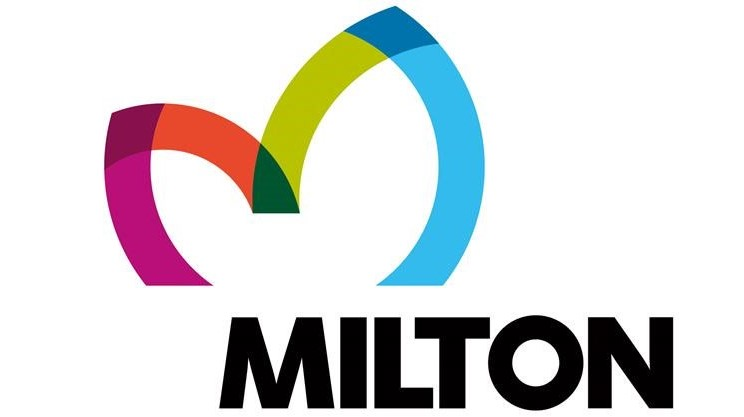
- October 26, 2026
- Turnout: 40.71%
| Candidate | George Minakakis | Gord Krantz |
| Popular vote | 20,262 | 11,398 |
| Percentage | 45.20% | 25.43% |
| Candidate | Zainab Azim | Sameera Ali |
| Popular vote | 6,203 | 3,540 |
| Percentage | 13.84% | 7.90% |
Mayor before election
Gordon Krantz
Elected mayor
George Minakakis

Mayor Gord Krantz, 89, who has led the city since 1980, and is Canada's longest-serving politician, announced in April that he was seeking re-election. He will be challenged by Ward 4 regional councillor Sameera Ali, Ward 1 councillor George Minakakis, educator and researcher Zainab Azim, Milton Muslim Moms founder Maliha Ahmed, intern Abdulkareem Akbik, and University of Waterloo urban planning student Arjun Joshi. George Minakakis won the election with 45.2% of the vote, ending Krantz' 46 years tenure as Mayor of Milton.

| Candidate | Vote | % |
|---|---|---|
| Gord Krantz (X) | 11398 | 25.43% |
| Maliha K. Ahmed | 536 | 1.20% |
| Nadeem Akbar | 2160 | 4.82% |
| Abdulkareem Akbik | 72 | 0.16% |
| Sameera Ali | 3540 | 7.90% |
| Che'z Amun | 135 | 0.30% |
| Zainab Azim | 6203 | 13.84% |
| Arjun Joshi | 344 | 0.77% |
| Asif Khan | 175 | 0.39% |
| George Minakakis | 20262 | 45.20% |

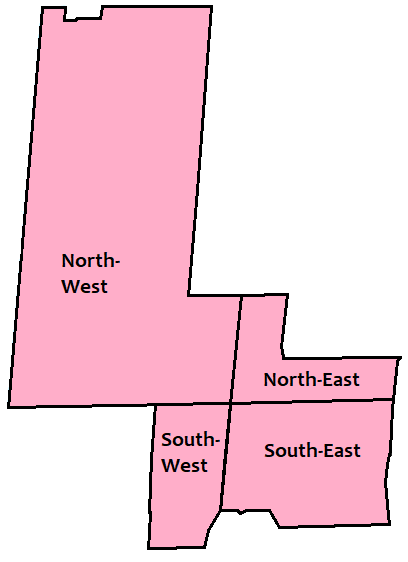
Map of Milton's four wards

=== Regional councillors ===
Four regional councillors are elected in 1 of 4 wards.

| Candidate | Vote | % |
Ward 1 (North-West)
| Colin Best (X) | 9059 | 88.81% |
| Sajid Chaudhry | 1142 | 11.19% |
Ward 2 (North-East)
| John Challinor | 7402 | 61.80% |
| Galen Naidoo Harris | 3723 | 31.08% |
| Syed Naqvi | 620 | 5.18% |
| Yagya Paudel | 233 | 1.95% |
Ward 3 (South-East)
| Rick Di Lorenzo | 5903 | 51.35% |
| Sammy Ijaz (X) | 4607 | 40.08% |
| Haris Iqbal | 328 | 5.72% |
| Salman Zafar | 657 | 2.85% |
Ward 4 (South-West)
| Adejisola Atiba | 593 | 5.88% |
| Khurshid A. Khan | 1838 | 18.24% |
| Sarah Marshall | 6037 | 59.90% |
| Syed Raza | 1009 | 10.01% |
| Youssef Roshdy | 602 | 5.97% |

=== Local councillors ===
Four local councillors are elected in 1 of 4 wards.

| Candidate | Vote | % |
Ward 1
| Nabil Ahmed | 1032 | 10.23% |
| Rahul Chaudhari | 121 | 1.20% |
| Donna Danielli | 2815 | 27.90% |
| Owen Gray | 5896 | 58.45% |
| Gourav Suri | 224 | 2.22% |
Ward 2
| Arthur Amadi | 1764 | 14.92% |
| Melissa Cassells | 2338 | 19.78% |
| Lori Foster | 1033 | 8.74% |
| Ahmad Jamal | 928 | 7.85% |
| Shan Jayatilake | 46 | 0.39% |
| Patrick Murphy | 4941 | 41.79% |
| Tanya Sethi | 772 | 6.53% |
Ward 3
| Sanjay Gupta | 3624 | 32.83% |
| Adil Khalqi (X) | 7415 | 67.17% |
Ward 4
| Naveed Ahmed | 942 | 9.45% |
| Zaheer Ashraf | 1503 | 15.08% |
| Tahira Haroon | 973 | 9.76% |
| Ginni Malik | 1688 | 16.94% |
| Ada Nwosu | 1396 | 14.01% |
| Giles Vanderholt | 3465 | 34.76% |

== Oakville ==
List of candidates:

=== Mayor ===
2026 Oakville mayoral election
- October 26, 2026
- Turnout: 34.26%
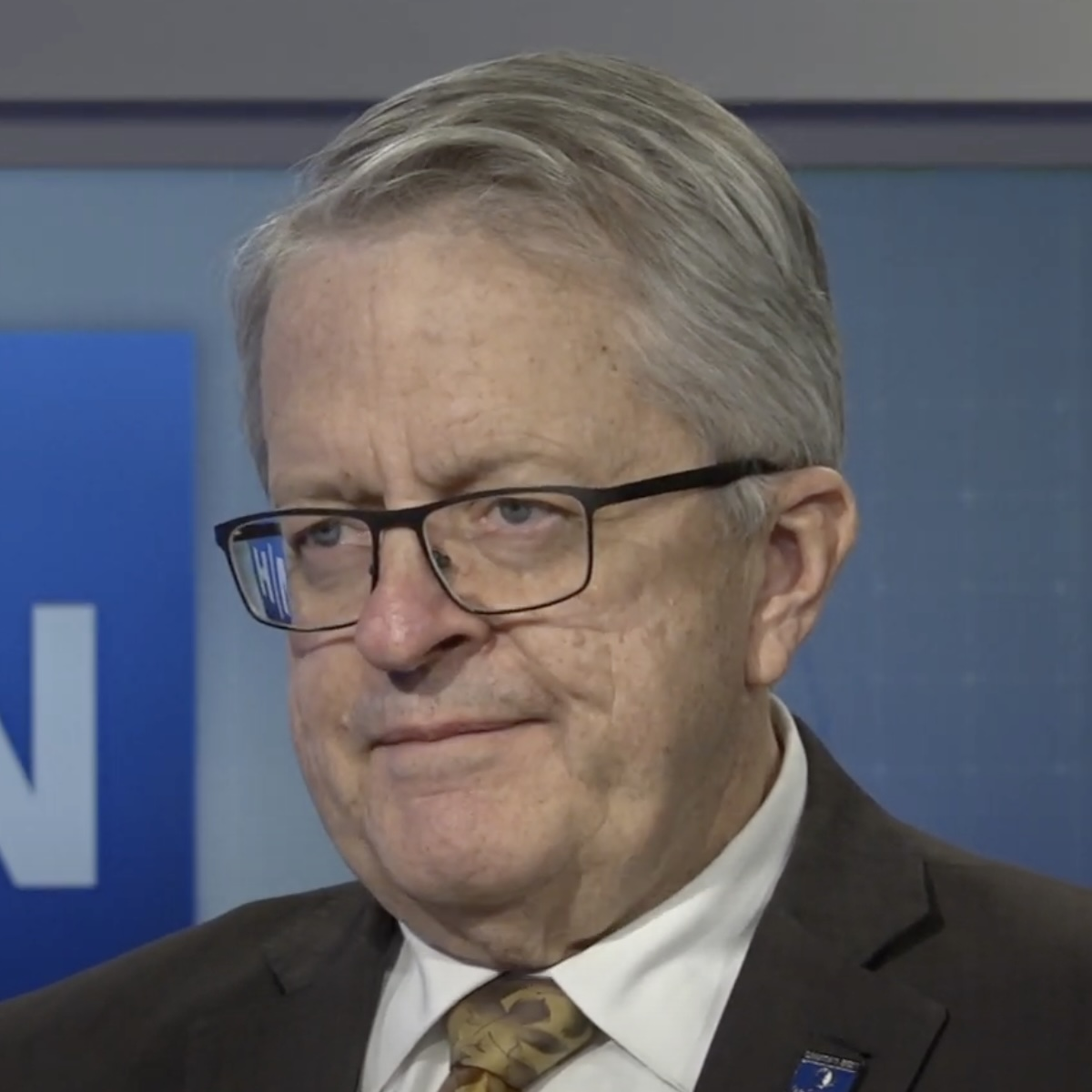
| | JK | SO |
| Candidate | Jeff Knoll | Sean O'Meara |
| Popular vote | 21,866 | 13,567 |
| Percentage | 36.31% | 22.53% |
| | | JH |
| Candidate | Rob Burton | Julia Hanna |
| Popular vote | 12,254 | 10,642 |
| Percentage | 20.35% | 17.67% |
Mayor before election
Rob Burton
Elected mayor
Jeff Knoll

Mayor Rob Burton is running for re-election. He waited until the last day to register.

Candidates

- Rob Burton, mayor
- Arvind Choudhary, software development manager and realtor.
- Julia Hanna, restaurant owner, previously ran in the 2018 and 2022 mayoral elections.
- Jeff Knoll, Ward 5 town and regional councillor since 2000. Former staffer for Progressive Conservative MPP Terence Young.
- Sean O'Meara, Ward 1 town and regional councillor since 2014. Former staffer for Liberal MPP Kevin Flynn.

| Mayoral Candidate | Vote | % |
|---|---|---|
| Jeff Knoll | 21,866 | 36.31 |
| Sean O'Meara | 13,567 | 22.53 |
| Rob Burton (X) | 12,254 | 20.35 |
| Julia Hanna | 10,642 | 17.67 |
| Arvind Choudhary | 1,887 | 3.13 |

=== Oakville Town Council ===
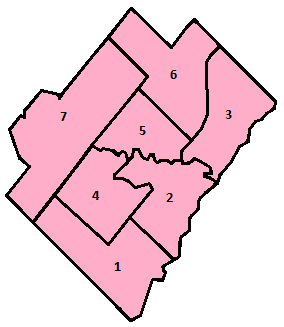
Map of Oakville's wards to be used in this election.

==== Town and regional council ====
| Candidate | Vote | % |
Ward 1
| Jonathan McNeice | Acclaimed | |
Ward 2
| Stacey Saunders | 3,002 | 38.29 |
| Sarah Perkin | 2,202 | 28.08 |
| Desmond Jordan | 1,896 | 24.18 |
| Zena Al-Mudaris | 741 | 9.45 |
Ward 3
| Janet Haslett-Theall (X) | Acclaimed | |
Ward 4
| Roger Lapworth | 3,994 | 33.97 |
| Suzan Chong | 3,130 | 26.62 |
| Hutchison Lee | 2,090 | 17.77 |
| Kashif (Kash) Chaudry | 1,051 | 8.94 |
| Farah Shamim | 1,023 | 8.70 |
| Vandana Giri | 471 | 4.01 |
Ward 5
| Mackenzie Grant | 3,910 | 43.54 |
| Michael Reid | 3,277 | 36.49 |
| Orla Johnston | 1,794 | 19.98 |
Ward 6
| Tom Adams (X) | Acclaimed | |
Ward 7
| Nav Nanda (X) | 2,245 | 40.45 |
| Bilal Kader | 1,869 | 33.68 |
| Vick Walia | 833 | 15.01 |
| Ajay Rosha | 401 | 7.23 |
| Gaganpreet Darar | 202 | 3.64 |

==== Town council ====
| Candidate | Vote | % |
Ward 1
| Alexandra Caldwell | 4,133 | 48.33 |
| Nancy Ortenburg | 2,033 | 23.77 |
| Pierce Lang | 1,166 | 13.63 |
| David Imrie | 687 | 8.03 |
| Amir Henry | 533 | 6.23 |
Ward 2
| Ray Chisholm (X) | 5,774 | 73.11 |
| Sana Waqar | 1,121 | 14.19 |
| Ayesha Khawaja | 1,003 | 1,003 |
Ward 3
| Morgan Elliott | 5,551 | 75.92 |
| Jen Zhou | 1,761 | 24.08 |
Ward 4
| Peter Longo (X) | 9,528 | 80.38 |
| Syed Tahir | 1,469 | 12.39 |
| Luba Slanina | 856 | 7.22 |
Ward 5
| Audrey Wubbenhorst | 2,657 | 29.23 |
| Matt Ray Smith | 2,455 | 27.00 |
| Sue Heddle | 1,873 | 20.60 |
| Jerome Adamo | 1,115 | 12.26 |
| Thane Mitches | 547 | 6.02 |
| Mirsab Fasih | 444 | 4.88 |
Ward 6
| Natalia Lishchyna (X) | 4,849 | 65.06 |
| Pierre Sauvageot | 1,535 | 20.60 |
| Smita Tulsani | 1,069 | 14.34 |
Ward 7
| Scott Xie (X) | 3,027 | 54.48 |
| Zulfi Malik | 1,645 | 29.61 |
| Ali Hosny | 884 | 15.91 |
