= Oakville Town Council =

Oakville Town Council is the governing body of the Town of Oakville, Ontario, Canada.

The council consists of the mayor plus fourteen elected councillors elected among seven wards. Within each ward, the Town Councillor represents the ward solely in Oakville Town Council, while the Town and Regional Councillor is a member of the governing council of the Regional Municipality of Halton in addition to being a member of the Town Council.

== Current composition (2026–2030) ==
Elected in the 2026 municipal election

Ward	Regional & Town Councillor	Town Councillor	Communities
Mayor	Jeff Knoll		
1	Jonathan McNeice	Alexandra Caldwell	Bronte, Lakeshore Woods, Bronte Creek
2	Stacey Saunders	Ray Chisholm	Central Oakville, Kerr Village, eastern Glen Abbey
3	Janet Haslett-Theall	Morgan Elliott	Charnwood, Ennisclare, Clearview, Downtown
4	Roger Lapworth	Peter Longo	Westoak Trails, western Glen Abbey, Palermo
5	Mackenzie Grant	Audrey Wubbenhorst	Kent Gardens, River Oaks, Uptown Core, Sheridan College
6	Tom Adams	Natalia Lishchyna	Falgarwood, Joshua's Creek, Postridge
7	Nav Nanda	Scott Xie	Neyagawa, Trafaglar, Glenorchy

== Previous councils ==
=== 2022–2026 ===
Elected in the 2022 municipal election

Ward	Regional & Town Councillor	Town Councillor	Communities
Mayor	Rob Burton		
1	Sean O'Meara	Jonathan McNeice	Bronte, Lakeshore Woods, Bronte Creek
2	Cathy Duddeck	Ray Chisholm	Central Oakville, Kerr Village, eastern Glen Abbey
3	Janet Haslett-Theall	Dave Gittings	Charnwood, Ennisclare, Clearview, Downtown
4	Allan Elgar	Peter Longo	Westoak Trails, western Glen Abbey, Palermo
5	Jeff Knoll	Marc Grant	Kent Gardens, River Oaks, Uptown Core, Sheridan College
6	Tom Adams	Natalia Lishchyna	Falgarwood, Joshua's Creek, Postridge
7	Nav Nanda	Scott Xie	Neyagawa, Trafaglar, Glenorchy

=== 2018–2022 Council ===
Elected in the 2018 municipal election

Ward	Regional & Town Councillor	Town Councillor
Mayor	Rob Burton	
1	Sean O'Meara	Beth Robertson
2	Cathy Duddeck	Ray Chisholm
3	Dave Gittings	Janet Haslett-Theall
4	Allan Elgar	Peter Longo
5	Jeff Knoll	Marc Grant
6	Tom Adams	Natalia Lishchyna
7	Pavan Parmar	Jasvinder Sandhu

=== 2014–2018 Council ===
Ward	Regional & Town Councillor	Town Councillor
Mayor	Rob Burton	
1	Sean O'Meara	Ralph Robinson
2	Cathy Duddeck	Pam Damoff (until 2015); Ray Chisholm (after 2016)
3	Dave Gittings	Nick Hutchins
4	Allan Elgar	Roger Lapworth
5	Jeff Knoll	Marc Grant
6	Tom Adams	Max Khan (until 2015); Natalia Lishchyna (after 2015)

=== 2010–2014 Council ===
Ward	Regional & Town Councillor	Town Councillor
Mayor	Rob Burton	
1	Alan Johnston	Ralph Robinson
2	Cathy Duddeck	Pam Damoff
3	Keith Bird	Dave Gittings
4	Allan Elgar	Roger Lapworth
5	Jeff Knoll	Marc Grant
6	Tom Adams	Max Khan

=== 2006–2010 Council ===
Ward	Regional & Town Councillor	Town Councillor
Mayor	Rob Burton	
1	Alan Johnston	Ralph Robinson
2	Fred Oliver	Cathy Duddeck
3	Keith Bird	Mary Chapin
4	Allan Elgar	Roger Lapworth
5	Jeff Knoll	Marc Grant
6	Tom Adams	Max Khan

=== 2003–2006 Council ===
Ward	Regional & Town Councillor	Town Councillor
Mayor	Ann Mulvale	
1	Mike Lansdown	Ralph Robinson
2	Fred Oliver	Cathy Duddeck
3	Keith Bird	Chris Stoate
4	Allan Elgar	Renee Sandelowski
5	Jeff Knoll	Marc Grant
6	Janice Wright	Tom Adams

=== 2000–2003 Council ===
Ward	Regional & Town Councillor	Town Councillor
Mayor	Ann Mulvale	
1	Kevin Flynn	Ralph Robinson
2	Fred Oliver	Linda Hardacre
3	Keith Bird	Tedd Smith
4	Allan Elgar	Jody Sanderson
5	Jeff Knoll	Janice Caster
6	Kurt Franklin	Janice Wright

== See also ==
- List of mayors of Oakville, Ontario
- Burlington City Council
