= 2003 Ontario municipal elections =

- November 10, 2003
- Turnout: 40.18%

In the 2003 municipal elections in Ontario, voters in Ontario, Canada, elected mayors, councillors, school board trustees and all other elected officials in all of Ontario's municipalities.

== Results of election ==
According to the Association of Municipalities of Ontario, province-wide turnout for municipal elections in 2003 was 40.18% across 408 municipalities. This was down roughly 1%. 574 positions were acclaimed and 28 municipalities reported that their entire councils were acclaimed. In all, there were 5,103 candidates for 2,268 positions.

Here are results of mayoral races in selected cities in the civic elections held on November 10, 2003.

== Ajax ==
- Steve Parish 10,302
- Kip Van Kempen 4,192

== Aurora ==
- Tim Jones 5,597
- Homer Farsad 3,014

== Barrie ==
- Rob Hamilton 14,213
- Patricia B. Copeland 7,901
- Jim Perri 5,020
- Jon Vink 395

== Belleville ==
- Mary-Anne Sills 5,945
- Neil R. Ellis 5,707
- Doug Parker 3,256
- Trueman Tuck 57

== Brampton ==
- Susan Fennell 34,436
- Bill Cowie 19,184

== Brant ==
- Ron Eddy 4,391
- Steve Comisky 3,590

== Brantford ==
- Mike Hancock 11,668
- Chris Friel 11,653
- Randy Tooke 721

== Burlington ==
- Rob MacIsaac (acclaimed)

== Caledon ==
- Marolyn Morrison 4,075
- Richard Whitehead 3,855
- Gary Wiles 3,635
- Anthony Di Somma 1,455

== Cambridge ==
- Doug Craig 13,005
- Fatima Pereira 4,142

== Chatham–Kent ==
- Diane Gagner 16,737
- Austin Wright 6,033
- Mary K. Lee 4,817
- Richard Erickson 4,202
- Larry Brundritt 1,989
- William "Bill" Arends 1,472

== Clarington ==
- John Mutton 16,143
- Richard Ward 1,824

== Cornwall ==
- Phil Poirier 7,271
- Brian Sylvester 6,131
- Andre Rivette 1,756

== Georgina ==
- Robert Grossi 6,631
- Jeffrey Holec 4,441

== Greater Sudbury ==
In a surprisingly active race (Toronto was the only city in the province with more mayoral candidates on the ballot), city councillor David Courtemanche emerged the victor over businessman Paul Marleau to succeed retiring mayor Jim Gordon.

2003 Greater Sudbury municipal election: Mayor of Greater Sudbury
| Candidate | Votes | % |
|---|---|---|
| David Courtemanche | 19,152 | 35.56 |
| Paul Marleau | 11,360 | 21.10 |
| Colin Firth | 8,096 | 15.03 |
| Louise Portelance | 5,645 | 10.48 |
| John Caruso | 4,693 | 8.71 |
| Tom Boyuk | 1,930 | 3.58 |
| Brian R. Gatien | 1,280 | 2.38 |
| Richard Doyon | 667 | 1.24 |
| Mary Fournier Pagnutti | 405 | 0.75 |
| David Chevrier | 271 | 0.50 |
| Yvonne Neison | 141 | 0.26 |
| Robert Maurice | 102 | 0.19 |
| Ed Pokonzie | 67 | 0.12 |
| David Popescu | 42 | 0.08 |
| Total valid votes | 53,851 | 100.00 |

== Guelph ==
In 2003, Guelph was the only major city in the province where both of the leading candidates for mayor were women.

- Kate Quarrie 16,158
- Karen Farbridge 12,291
- Billy Craven 1,156
- Kurt Krausewitz 423
- John Ustation 347

== Halton Hills ==
- Rick Bonnette 5,035
- John Day 4,022
- Kathy Gastle 2,206
- Marilyn Serjeantson 1,423

== Haldimand ==
- Marie Trainer 7,303
- Lorraine Bergstrand 6,192
- Wilfred Marlowe 1,363

== Hamilton ==
See 2003 Hamilton municipal election

- Larry Di Ianni 70,539
- David Christopherson 54,298
- Dick Wildeman 4,462
- Michael Peters 3,270
- Tom Murray 2,881
- Michael J. Baldasaro 2,569
- Matt Jelly 510

== Kawartha Lakes ==
- Barbara Kelly 9,748
- John R. Macklem 7,189
- Patrick J. O’Reilly 6,882
- Patrick Dunn 4,585
- Joe McGuire 4,335

== Kingston ==
- Harvey Rosen 23,179
- Isabel Turner 4,550
- Richard Moller 3,167
- Dave Meers 2,958
- Jeffrey P. Lowes 453
- Joseph R. Barr 263

== Kitchener ==
- Carl Zehr 23,707
- Jon Huemiller 4,553
- Ferenc Kulcsar 739

== London ==
- Anne Marie DeCicco 48,789
- Vaughan Minor 37,337
- Garry Moon 1,871
- Ivan W. Kasiurak 865
- Andrew McIlhargey 729
- Carl Harris 636
- Frank Burlock 578
- Linden John Cassina 506
- Mesbah Eldeeb 388
- Kenneth Venus 312
- Peter Schuller 296

== Markham ==
- Donald Cousens 31,532
- Bernadette Manning 5,635
- Sam Orrico 1,941

== Milton ==
- Gord Krantz 6,238
- Rick Malboeuf 2,224
- Al Volpe 701
- Las Polcz 409
- Vito Agozzino 369
- David Lloyd 331

== Mississauga ==
2003 Mississauga mayoral election
- November 10, 2003
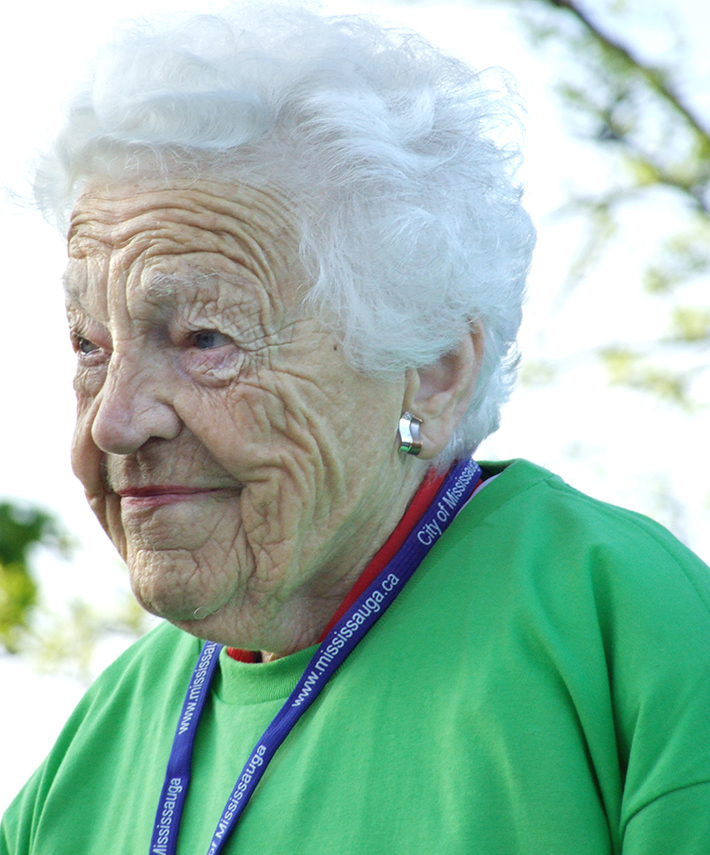
| | | MK |
| Candidate | Hazel McCallion | Masood Khan |
| Popular vote | 74,719 | 2,304 |
| Percentage | 91.64% | 2.83% |
Mayor before election
Hazel McCallion
Elected mayor
Hazel McCallion

First elected mayor in 1978, Hazel McCallion was easily reelected to her tenth term. As one of the longest serving politicians in the country, Mayor McCallion is well known to Mississaugans.

- Hazel McCallion 74,719
- Masood Khan 2,304
- Charles Coober 1,613
- Larry J. Mancini 1,478
- Dyal Chanderpaul 1,419

== Newmarket ==
- Al Heller 8,645
- Tom Taylor 4,604
- David Martin 2,268

== Niagara Falls ==
- Ted Salci 17,843
- Wayne Thomson 10,284
- Darren W. Wood 405
- John (Ringo) Beam 376

== Norfolk ==
See: 2003 Norfolk County municipal election

- Rita Kalmbach 12,143
- Brian Decker 5,158

== North Bay ==
- Vic Fedeli 13,025
- Lynne Bennett 3,147
- Tim Wright 686
- Jeff Marceau 508

== Oakville ==
Incumbent Ann Mulvale's narrow defeat of development skeptic Rob Burton had to be confirmed later in a judicial recount.

- Ann Mulvale 15,728
- Rob Burton 15,716
- Richard Serra 573

== Oshawa ==
Incumbent mayor Nancy Diamond was defeated by challenger John Gray in a race that also hinged on economic and urban development; Gray was the pro-development candidate.

- John Gray 14,921
- Michael Clarke 7,333
- Nancy Diamond 5,871
- Ed Kowalczyk 1,827
- Darlene Hovland 229

== Ottawa ==
Incumbent Bob Chiarelli was reelected after facing an unexpectedly strong challenge from Terry Kilrea.

- Bob Chiarelli 104,595
- Terry Kilrea 66,634
- Ike Awgu 5,394
- Ron Burke 2,698
- John A. Bell 2,027
- Donna Upson 1,312
- Paula Nemchin 1,191
- John Turmel 1,166

== Peterborough ==
- Sylvia Sutherland 11,194
- Douglas Peacock 10,522
- D. Paul Ayotte 5,155
- Margaree Edwards 1,326

== Pickering ==
- Dave Ryan 10,426
- Doug Dickerson 7,456

== Quinte West ==
- Bob Campney 4,611
- Terry R. F. Cassidy 3,051
- Bill Armstrong 2,801
- Claude Rolland du-Lude 118

== Richmond Hill ==
- William F. Bell 14,405
- William C. Lazenby 7,818
- Sonny Khan 1,116

== Sarnia ==
- Mike Bradley 13,707
- Rose-Ann Nathan 5,716
- Tom Hurst 623
- Carlos Murray 330
- Hermann Martens 198

== Sault Ste. Marie ==
- John Rowswell 11,713
- Peter Vaudry 8,579
- Patricia Jennings 7,000
- Gary Bedryk 812

== St. Catharines ==
See: 2003 St. Catharines municipal election

- Tim Rigby 9,558
- Wendy Patriquin 9,504
- Rondi Craig 9,189
- Mark Klimchuk 1,166
- Burt Koiter 415
- Boris Petrovici 212

== St. Thomas ==
- Jeff Kohler 5,876
- Joanne Brooks 3,596
- John R. Heaslip 587

== Thunder Bay ==
- Lynn Peterson 26,572
- Frank Pullia 13,690
- Orville Santa 3,767
- Don Slobojan 3,602
- (Mike) Marvin McMenemy 330

== Timmins ==
Victor M. Power, Mayor of Timmins for 17 of the 20 years from 1980 to 2000, who did not stand in the 2000 municipal election, came out of retirement and was returned against one-term incumbent and the first female mayor of Timmins Jamie Lim.

- Victor M. Power 11,792
- Jamie Lim 6,653

== Toronto ==
David Miller was elected mayor defeating John Tory, Barbara Hall and John Nunziata. See also: 2003 Toronto municipal election Results of 2003 Toronto election

== Vaughan ==
- Michael Di Biase 26,113
- Robert Craig 15,351

== Waterloo ==
- Herb Epp 11,388
- Lynne Woolstencroft 5,706
- Morty Taylor 5,699
- Ben Brown 337

== Welland ==
- Damian Goulbourne 7,554
- Cindy Forster 5,312
- Philip Bradley 2,036
- Dick Reuter 1,892
- John Watt 473
- Frank Garofalo 378

== Whitby ==
- Marcel Brunelle 11,548
- Judy Griffiths 3,052

== Windsor ==
- Eddie Francis 39,042
- Bill Marra 31,517
- Ernie Lamont 2,484

== Woodstock ==
- Michael Harding 4,789
- Sandra J. Talbot 3,520

== See also ==
- Municipal elections in Canada
- 2000 Ontario municipal elections
- 2006 Ontario municipal elections
