= George Minakakis =

Canadian politician

His Worship George Minakakis

Mayor of Milton
- Incumbent
- Assumed office November 15, 2026
- Preceded by: Gord Krantz

Personal details
- Party: Independent
- Website: Official website

George Minakakis is the mayor of Milton, Ontario, and a former corporate executive.

== Business career ==
Minakakis was Country General Manager for Luxottica in Canada, overseeing LensCrafters, Pearle Vision, Sunglass Hut, and licensed retail to department stores. He then was made CEO, Greater China for the same company, as it brought LensCrafters to the nation, later Country General Manager in Canada.

He was quoted repeatedly by Canadian news outlets in business articles, and wrote a number of opinion pieces.

== Political career ==
Minakakis gained note locally as chair of ACTION Milton, Association of Citizens Together In Our Nassagaweya, a group that fought a quarry application for Milton's Campbellville area, made by James Dick Construction Ltd. The group was well-funded, raising $100,000 in donation pledges early in its existence.

Incumbent councillor Kristina Tesser Derksen won re-election in Ward 1, during the local municipal elections, with 4,200 votes to Minakakis' 1,671.

In 2025, Tesser Derksen was elected Member of Parliament for Malton East-Halton Hills South in 2022. A by-election was called, despite past precedent that the second-place finisher in a race would be appointed. Minakakis won with 45.43% of the vote, in a race of nine candidates.

He won a by-election as Ward 1 municipal councillor in Milton, in October 2025. On council, he was part of a successful vote against a temporary ban on major AI data centre development. He had previously advocated for increased use of AI in the municipality.
