= Milton East—Halton Hills South =

Federal electoral district in Ontario, Canada

Ontario electoral district
- Interactive map of riding boundaries from the 2025 federal election

Federal electoral district
- Legislature: House of Commons
MP
Kristina Tesser Derksen
Liberal
- District created: 2023
- First contested: 2025
- District webpage: profile, map

Demographics
- Population (2021): 116,592
- Electors (2025): 88,872
- Census division: Halton
- Census subdivision(s): Milton (part), Halton Hills (part)

Milton East—Halton Hills South (French: Milton-Est—Halton Hills-Sud) is a federal electoral district in Ontario, Canada. It came into effect upon the call of the 2025 Canadian federal election.

== Geography ==
Under the 2022 Canadian federal electoral redistribution the new riding will contain that parts of Milton riding east of Regional Road 25, plus the Georgetown area and the southern parts of Halton Hills taken from Wellington—Halton Hills.

== Demographics ==
According to the 2021 Canadian census

Languages: 71.7% English, 5.1% Urdu, 2.5% Arabic, 2.0% French, 2.0% Spanish, 1.7% Punjabi, 1.6% Polish, 1.5% Portuguese, 1.1% Serbo-Croatian, 1.1% Tagalog

Religions: 55.0% Christian (32.5% Catholic, 3.6% Anglican, 3.0% United Church, 2.7% Christian Orthodox, 1.5% Presbyterian, 1.2% Pentecostal, 10.6% Other), 23.8% No religion, 13.4% Muslim, 4.2% Hindu, 2.4% Sikh

Median income: $49,200 (2020)

Average income: $63,050 (2020)

Panethnic groups in Milton East—Halton Hills South (2021)
Panethnic group	2021	
Panethnic group	Pop.	%
European (Note: Statistic includes all persons that did not make up part of a visible minority or an indigenous identity.)	69,850	60.64%
South Asian	21,250	18.45%
Middle Eastern (Note: Statistic includes total responses of "West Asian" and "Arab" under visible minority section on census.)	5,025	4.36%
African	4,740	4.11%
Southeast Asian (Note: Statistic includes total responses of "Filipino" and "Southeast Asian" under visible minority section on census.)	4,440	3.85%
East Asian (Note: Statistic includes total responses of "Chinese", "Korean", and "Japanese" under visible minority section on census.)	3,440	2.99%
Latin American	2,450	2.13%
Indigenous	1,240	1.08%
Other/multiracial (Note: Statistic includes total responses of "Visible minority, n.i.e." and "Multiple visible minorities" under visible minority section on census.)	2,755	2.39%
Total responses	115,195	98.68%
Total population	116,730	100%
Notes: Totals greater than 100% due to multiple origin responses. Demographics based on 2022 Canadian federal electoral redistribution riding boundaries.

== History ==
Parliament	Years	Member	Party
Milton East—Halton Hills South; Riding created from Milton and Wellington—Halton Hills
45th	2025–present	Kristina Tesser Derksen	Liberal

== Election results ==
2025 Canadian federal election
Party	Candidate	Votes	%	±%	Expenditures
Liberal	Kristina Tesser Derksen	32,178	48.25	+6.54	$128,386.69
Conservative	Parm Gill	32,157	48.22	+6.97	$132,146.27
New Democratic	Muhammad Riaz Sahi	1,029	1.54	–8.03	$0.00
Green	Susan Doyle	672	1.01	–1.59	$0.00
People's	Walter J. Hofman	475	0.71	–4.17	$9,990.04
Independent	Shahbaz Mahmood Khan	174	0.26	N/A	$2,739.15
Total valid votes/expense limit		66,685	99.51	–	$135,890.29
Total rejected ballots		328	0.49		
Turnout		67,013	74.18		
Eligible voters		90,340			
Liberal notional hold		Swing		–0.21	
Source: Elections Canada
Notes: This riding's results were subject to an automatic judicial recount on May 9, 2025. Number of eligible voters does not include election day registrations.

2021 federal election redistributed results
Party	Vote	%
Liberal	21,508	41.71
Conservative	21,269	41.25
New Democratic	4,935	9.57
People's	2,514	4.88
Green	1,339	2.60

== See also ==
- List of Canadian electoral districts
