= Greater Toronto Marketing Alliance =

- Founded: 1997
- Type: Foreign Direct Investment
- Purpose: Foreign Direct Investment, Investment Attraction
- Location(s): 350 Bay Street; Toronto, Ontario, Canada; M5H 2S6
- Region served: Halton, Peel, Toronto, York, Durham
- Key people: Mayor David Ryan, Chair; George Hanus, President & CEO; Tony Romano, Vice President, Corporate & Investor Services
- Website: https://greatertoronto.org

The Greater Toronto Marketing Alliance (GTMA) is a "public-private partnership that serves as the key point of contact for businesses exploring opportunities in the Greater Toronto Area (GTA)". The partnership is a collaboration of the 29 municipalities and regions in the Greater Toronto Area, the governments of Ontario and Canada, several not-for-profit organizations, and a number of private sector corporations. The GTMA provides business information and site selection services to prospective investors at no cost.

== About GTMA ==
=== Regions and Communities Served ===
The GTMA represents the 25 communities and 4 regional municipalities contained within the GTA, and on behalf of its regional partners promotes the GTA's investment value proposition to international investors

Regions: Toronto, Durham, Halton, Peel (Town of Caledon, City of Mississauga, and the City of Brampton only), and York.

List of communities
- Town of Ajax
- Town of Aurora
- City of Brampton
- Township of Brock
- City of Burlington
- Town of Caledon
- Municipality of Clarington
- Town of East Gwillimbury
- Town of Georgina
- Town of Halton Hills
- Township of King
- Town of Markham
- Town of Milton
- City of Mississauga
- Town of Newmarket
- Town of Oakville
- City of Oshawa
- City of Pickering
- Town of Richmond Hill
- Township of Scugog
- City of Toronto
- Township of Uxbridge
- City of Vaughan
- Town of Whitby
- Municipality of Whitchurch–Stouffville

=== History ===
In 1997, former President of the Toronto Board of Trade, George A. Fierheller became the Founding Chair of a new organization "sponsored by the Mayors and Regional Chairs Committee led by Mayor Hazel McCallion and Mayor Gordon Krantz, and an ad hoc group of the 29 Boards of Trade and Chambers of Commerce in the Greater Toronto Area (GTA)". They named this new organization 'The Greater Toronto Marketing Alliance' and announced that its directive would be to "expand the economy of the Greater Toronto Area by raising the profile of the region internationally to attract new investment and employment".

In 2002 George A. Fierheller retired as Chair of the GTMA. Renato Discenza served from 2002 to 2005, followed by David Gavsie from 2005 to 2007

The current chairman is Lou Milrad

=== Corporate Structure ===
The GTMA was established as a Public-Private Partnership often known as a PPP. The GTMA receives about 60% of its funding from government, the majority from member municipalities who contribute the bulk of the government support, with the provincial and federal levels making up the rest. The remaining 40% of the GTMA's operating budget comes from the private sector.

The GTMA is governed by a 24-member board of directors from both the public and private sector.

=== Mission ===
The GTMA's mission and mandate is to expand the economy of the Greater Toronto Area by raising the profile of the region internationally to attract new investment and employment. The GTMA's mandate is to provide all-encompassing services to investors interested in the Greater Toronto Area and to ensure that the Greater Toronto Area is positioned internationally as a preferred business location.

=== Services ===
Prospective investors working with the GTMA receive support and guidance from human resource consultants, financial and legal advisors, and commercial/industrial real estate professionals. They also benefit from key contacts with corporate executives and senior government officials.

In addition, the GTMA regularly hosts events to promote collaboration between various local and international companies, government organizations, foreign consulates and boards of trade. Notable examples include the GTMA's International Leaders Breakfast Club and the GTMA's Annual Celebrity Golf Tournament

== GTMA Publications ==
The Greater Toronto Marketing Alliance periodically undertakes key industry sector studies and research that profile the GTA and develop GTA-wide regional data useful for both local and international organizations.

Industry Sector Studies
- GTMA Agricultural and Agri-business in the GTA Study Phase 1, 2010
- GTMA Agricultural and Agri-business in the GTA Study Phase 2, 2010
- GTMA Agricultural and Agri-business in the GTA Study Phase 2 2010 Appendices
- GTA Advanced Manufacturing Case Studies- Full Report 2007
- Comprehensive Analysis and Positioning of the Energy and Environmental Industries in the GTA
- Information & Communications Technologies (ICT) Industry Profile 2004
- Interactive Digital Media Industry in the Greater Toronto Area
- GTA Manufacturing Study
GTMA Specific Publications
- GTMA Annual Review 2009 - 2010
- GTMA Annual Review 2008 - 2009

== See also ==
Greater Toronto Area
Ministry of Economic Development and Trade (Ontario)
