= 2014 Halton Region municipal elections =

2014 Halton Region municipal election
- October 27, 2014

Elections were held in the Regional Municipality of Halton of Ontario on October 27, 2014 in conjunction with municipal elections across the province.

== Halton Regional Council ==
Regional chair	Vote	%
Gary Carr (X)	84,348	77.56
Greg Woodruff	12,344	11.35
Naqvi Syed Ali	6,065	5.58
John Paulic	6,001	5.52

Position	Elected
Burlington mayor	Rick Goldring
Burlington Ward 1	Rick Craven
Burlington Ward 2	Marianne Meed Ward
Burlington Ward 3	John Taylor
Burlington Ward 4	Jack Dennison
Burlington Ward 5	Paul Sharman
Burlington Ward 6	Blair Lancaster
Halton Hills Mayor	Rick Bonnette
Halton Hills Wards 1 & 2	Clark Somerville (acclaimed)
Halton Hills Wards 3 & 4	Jane Fogal
Milton Mayor	Gord Krantz
Milton Wards 1,6,7,8	Mike Cluett
Milton Wards 2,3,4,5	Colin Best
Oakville Mayor	Rob Burton
Oakville Ward 1	Sean O'Meara
Oakville Ward 2	Cathy Duddeck
Oakville Ward 3	Dave Gittings
Oakville Ward 4	Allan Elgar
Oakville Ward 5	Jeff Knoll
Oakville Ward 6	Tom Adams

== Burlington ==
Mayoral Candidate	Vote	%
Rick Goldring (X)	36,237	85.82
Anne Marsden	3,043	7.21
Peter Rusin	2,942	6.97

== Halton Hills ==
Mayoral Candidate	Vote	%
Rick Bonnette (X)	12,253	87.30
Sally Stull	1,783	12.70

== Milton ==
Mayoral Candidate	Vote	%
Gord Krantz (X)	13,830	75.15
Stan Lazarski	2,743	14.90
Al Volpe	1,831	9.95

== Oakville ==
Mayoral Candidate	Vote	%
Rob Burton (X)	27,727	67.27
John McLaughlin	9,947	24.13
Gordon Brennan	1,679	4.07
Mary Kennedy	1,572	3.81
Greg Warchol	292	0.71
