= Kristina Tesser Derksen =

Canadian politician

Kristina Tesser Derksen MP
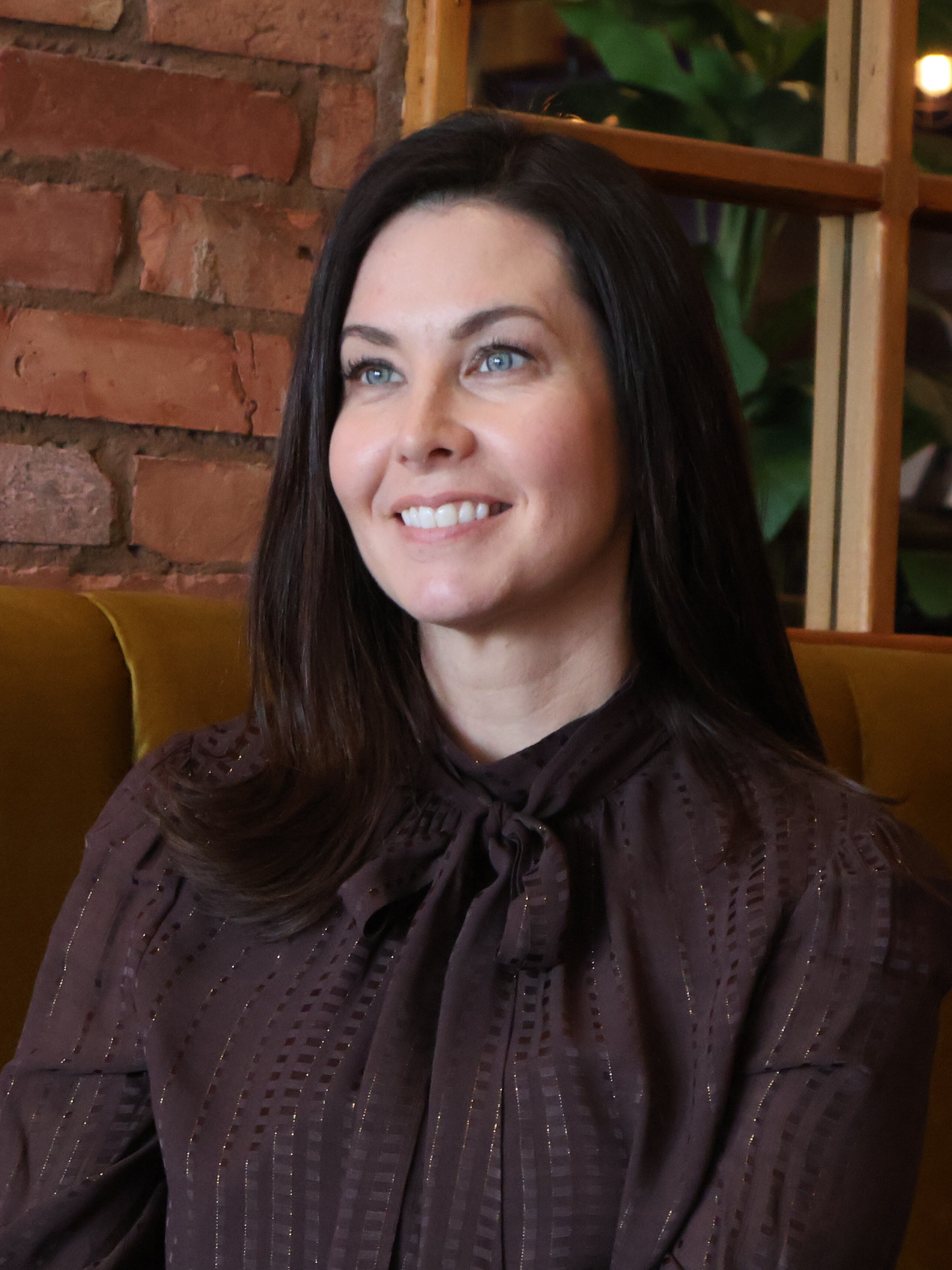
- Tesser Derksen in 2026

Member of Parliament for Milton East—Halton Hills South
- Incumbent
- Assumed office April 28, 2025
- Preceded by: Riding Established

Town of Milton Ward 1 Councillor
- In office 2018–2025
- Preceded by: Cindy Lunau
- Succeeded by: George Minakakis

Personal details
- Born: 1978 or 1979 (age 47–48) Milton, Ontario, Canada
- Party: Liberal
- Children: 4
- Website: mpkristinatd.ca

Kristina Tesser Derksen (born 1978 or 1979) is a Canadian lawyer and politician who was elected as the member of Parliament for Milton East—Halton Hills South in the 2025 Canadian federal election as a member of the Liberal Party. She previously served two terms as a Milton town councillor.

== Background ==
Tesser Derksen was born in 1978 or 1979 in Milton, Ontario, where she grew up. She earned an undergraduate degree in history and political science before earning a law degree from the University of Toronto.

== Political career ==
Tesser Derksen was first elected to Milton Town Council representing Ward 1 in 2018 and was re-elected in 2022.

In the 2025 Ontario provincial election, Tesser Derksen ran as the Ontario Liberal Party candidate for the riding of Milton. She was defeated by Progressive Conservative incumbent Zee Hamid.

In the 2025 federal election, Tesser Derksen ran as the Liberal candidate for the newly established riding of Milton East—Halton Hills South. Initially declared defeated, a subsequent validation process confirmed her victory by a margin of 29 votes over Conservative candidate Parm Gill. Because of the narrow margin, a judicial recount was automatically triggered. Following a three-day recount, her victory was confirmed with a revised margin of 21 votes. Her seat on the Milton council was declared vacant on May 26.

== Personal life ==
Tesser Derksen’s husband, Chris Derksen, is a small business owner. They were married in 1998 and have four children.

== Electoral record ==
2025 Canadian federal election: Milton East—Halton Hills South
Party	Candidate	Votes	%	±%	Expenditures
Liberal	Kristina Tesser Derksen	32,178	48.25	+6.54	$128,386.69
Conservative	Parm Gill	32,157	48.22	+6.97	$132,146.27
New Democratic	Muhammad Riaz Sahi	1,029	1.54	–8.03	$0.00
Green	Susan Doyle	672	1.01	–1.59	$0.00
People's	Walter J. Hofman	475	0.71	–4.17	$9,990.04
Independent	Shahbaz Mahmood Khan	174	0.26	N/A	$2,739.15
Total valid votes/expense limit		66,685	99.51	–	$135,890.29
Total rejected ballots		328	0.49		
Turnout		67,013	74.18		
Eligible voters		90,340			
Liberal notional hold		Swing		–0.21	
Source: Elections Canada
Notes: This riding's results were subject to an automatic judicial recount on May 9, 2025. Number of eligible voters does not include election day registrations.

2025 Ontario general election: Milton
Party	Candidate	Votes	%	±%
Progressive Conservative	Zee Hamid	20,091	47.43	+0.39
Liberal	Kristina Tesser Derksen	17,551	41.44	+3.18
New Democratic	Katherine-Anne Cirlincione	2,403	5.67	–1.09
Green	Susan Doyle	1,130	2.67	–0.09
New Blue	John Spina	866	2.04	–1.98
Centrist	Mohsin Rizvi	316	0.75	–
Total valid votes		42,357	99.45	
Total rejected, unmarked and declined ballots		235	0.55	+0.29
Turnout		42,592	41.98	+14.45
Eligible voters		101,453		
Progressive Conservative hold		Swing		–1.40
Source: Elections Ontario
