= 2022 Halton Region municipal elections =

Canadian municipal election

- October 24, 2022

Elections were held in the Regional Municipality of Halton of Ontario on October 24, 2022, in conjunction with municipal elections across the province.

== Halton Regional Council ==
Position	Elected
Chair
Gary Carr
Burlington
Mayor	Marianne Meed Ward
Councillor, Ward 1	Kelvin Galbraith
Councillor, Ward 2	Lisa Kearns
Councillor, Ward 3	Rory Nisan
Councillor, Ward 4	Shawna Stolte
Councillor, Ward 5	Paul Sharman
Councillor, Ward 6	Angelo Bentivegna
Halton Hills
Mayor	Ann Lawlor
Regional Councillor, Wards 1 & 2	Clark Somerville (acclaimed)
Regional Councillor, Wards 3 & 4	Jane Fogal
Milton
Mayor	Gord Krantz
Regional Councillor, Ward 1	Colin Best (acclaimed)
Regional Councillor, Ward 2	Rick Malboeuf (acclaimed)
Regional Councillor, Ward 3	Sammy Ijaz
Regional Councillor, Ward 4	Sameera Ali
Oakville
Mayor	Rob Burton
Regional Councillor, Ward 1	Sean O'Meara
Regional Councillor, Ward 2	Cathy Duddeck (acclaimed)
Regional Councillor, Ward 3	Janet Haslett-Theall (acclaimed)
Regional Councillor, Ward 4	Allan Elgar
Regional Councillor, Ward 5	Jeff Knoll
Regional Councillor, Ward 6	Tom Adams (acclaimed)
Regional Councillor, Ward 7	Nav Nanda

== Results ==
* denotes incumbency

== Halton Regional Chair ==
2022 Halton regional chair election
- October 24, 2022
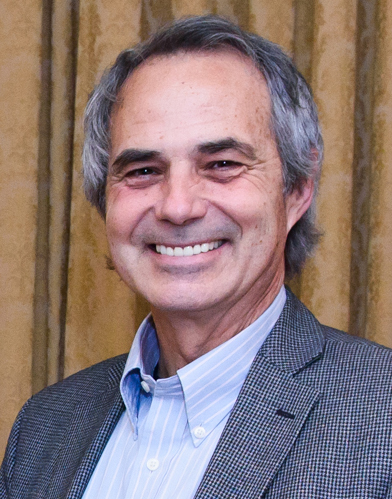

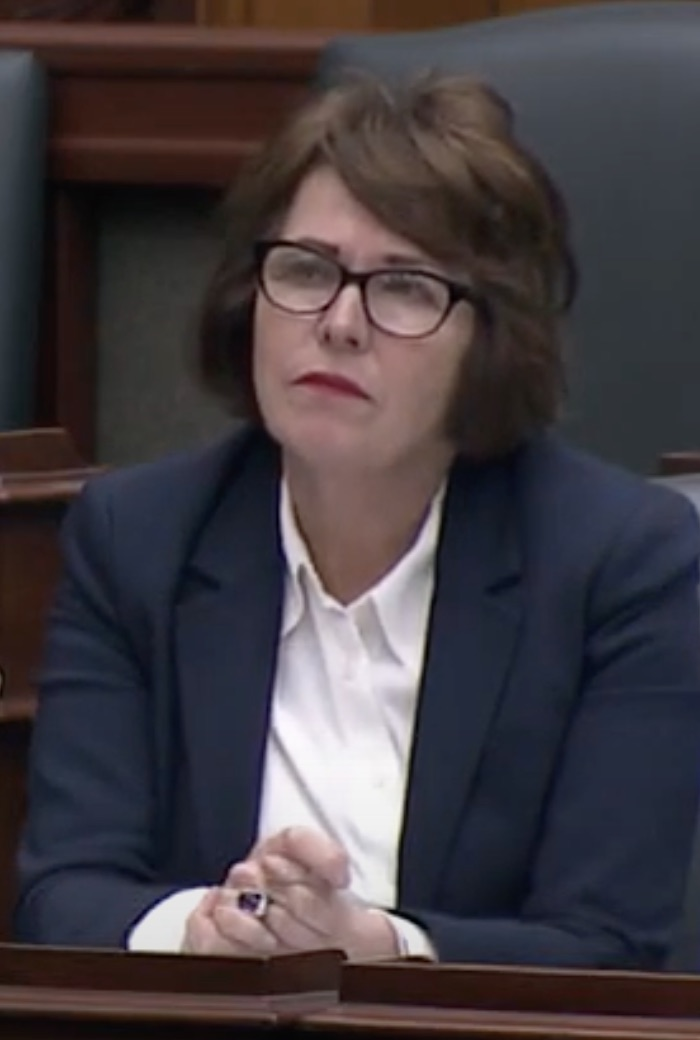
			AG
Candidate	Gary Carr*	Jane McKenna	Andrea Grebenc
Popular vote	51,776	35,830	20,276
Percentage	47.99%	33.21	18.79
Chair before election
Gary Carr
Elected Chair
Gary Carr

Incumbent chair Gary Carr faced off against former Progressive Conservative MPP for Burlington Jane McKenna and Halton District School Board trustee Andrea Grebenc.

Candidate	Vote	%
Gary Carr*	51,776	47.99
Jane McKenna	35,830	33.21
Andrea Grebenc	20,276	18.79

== Burlington ==
List of candidates:

=== Mayor ===
2022 Burlington mayoral election
- October 24, 2022
- Turnout: 27.58%
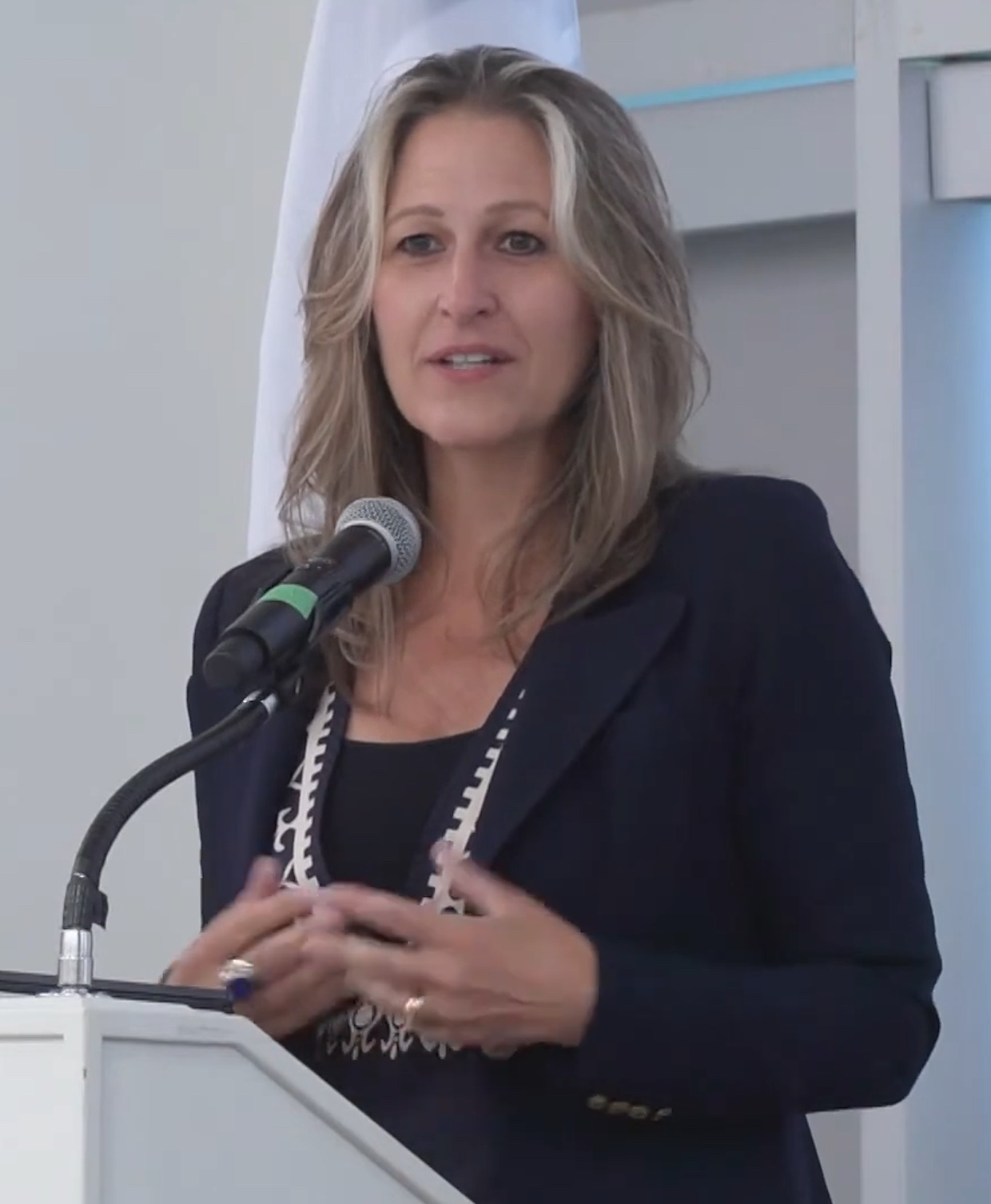
		JK
Candidate	Marianne Meed Ward*	Jim Kerr
Popular vote	30,135	5,194
Percentage	77.95%	13.43%
Mayor before election
Marianne Meed Ward
Elected mayor
Marianne Meed Ward

Burlington mayor Marianne Meed Ward announced she would be running for re-election on the first day of nominations, May 2. This ended speculation that she would run for Regional Chair. Running against Meed Ward is perennial candidate Anne Marsden who ran for regional chair in 2018.

Candidate	Vote	%
Marianne Meed Ward*	30,135	77.95
Jim Kerr	5,194	13.43
Anne Marsden	1,636	4.23
Steven Rieck	1,113	2.88
William Tuck	583	1.51

=== Regional and city councillors ===
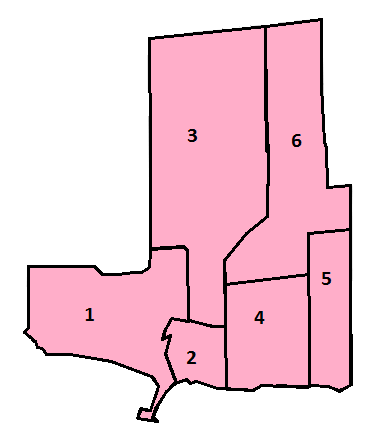
Map of Burlington's six wards

Candidate	Vote	%
Ward 1
Kelvin Galbraith*	4,155	63.35
Robert Radway	2,404	36.65
Ward 2
Lisa Kearns*	4,453	71.81
Tim O'Brien	1,095	17.66
Keith Demoe	653	10.53
Ward 3
Rory Nisan*	3,190	63.95
Jennifer Hounslow	1,394	27.95
Luke McEachern	404	8.10
Ward 4
Shawna Stolte*	3,591	47.01
Tony Brecknock	1,833	24.00
Olivia Duke	1,478	22.88
Eden Wood	467	6.11
Ward 5
Paul Sharman*	3,852	58.86
Andrew Hall	1,062	16.23
Guy D'Alesio	911	13.92
Denny Pirzas	719	10.99
Ward 6
Angelo Bentivegna*	3,678	61.11
Rick Greenspoon	1,725	28.66
Renato Velocci	616	10.23

== Halton Hills ==
List of candidates:

=== Mayor ===
Incumbent mayor Rick Bonnette did not run for re-election. Running to replace him include Acton businessman Norm Paulsen, town councillors Bryan Leiws, and Ann Lawlor and former East York alderman Ken Paige.

Candidate	Vote	%
Ann Lawlor	5,323	40.67
Bryan Lewis	4,743	36.24
Ken Paige	1,423	10.87
Norm Paulsen	1,019	7.79
Robert Gottardi	581	4.44

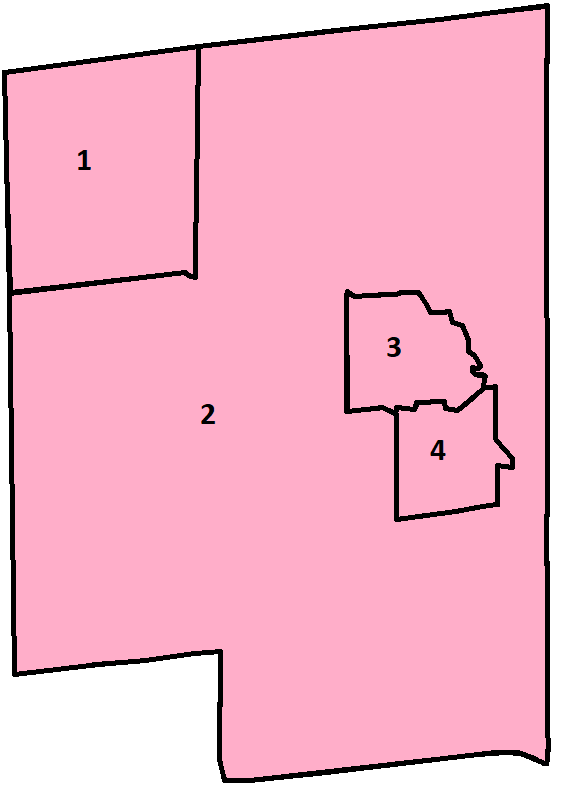
Map of Halton Hills wards

=== Regional councillors ===
Two Regional Councillors are elected in 1 of 2 wards.

Candidate	Vote	%
Wards 1 & 2
Clark Somerville*	Acclaimed	
Wards 3 & 4
Jane Fogal*	4,355	54.65
Wendy Farrow-Reed	3,614	43.35

=== Local councillors ===
Eight Local Councillors are elected in 1 of 4 wards (2 from each ward).

Candidate	Vote	%
Ward 1
Alex Hilson	1,627	41.12
Mike Albano*	1,237	31.26
Jon Hurst (X)	1,093	27.62
Ward 2
Jason Brass	854	20.73
Joseph Racinsky	771	18.72
Matt Kindbom	649	15.76
Greg Cosper	435	10.56
Geoff Maltby	418	10.15
Bryan Robinson	417	10.12
Maureen Gillham	305	7.40
Peter Snow	270	6.55
Ward 3
Chantal Garneau	1,982	31.81
Ron Norris	1,507	24.19
Drew Pullman	1,204	19.33
Waldo Paquette	854	13.71
Syl Carle	683	10.96
Ward 4
Bob Inglis*	2,783	42.70
D'Arcy Keene	2,180	33.45
Blake Mandarino	1,555	23.86

== Milton ==
List of candidates:

=== Mayor ===
2022 Milton mayoral election
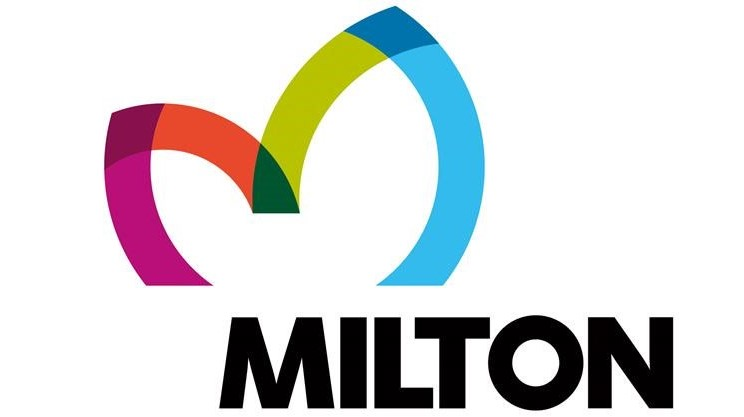
- October 24, 2022
- Turnout: 28.99%

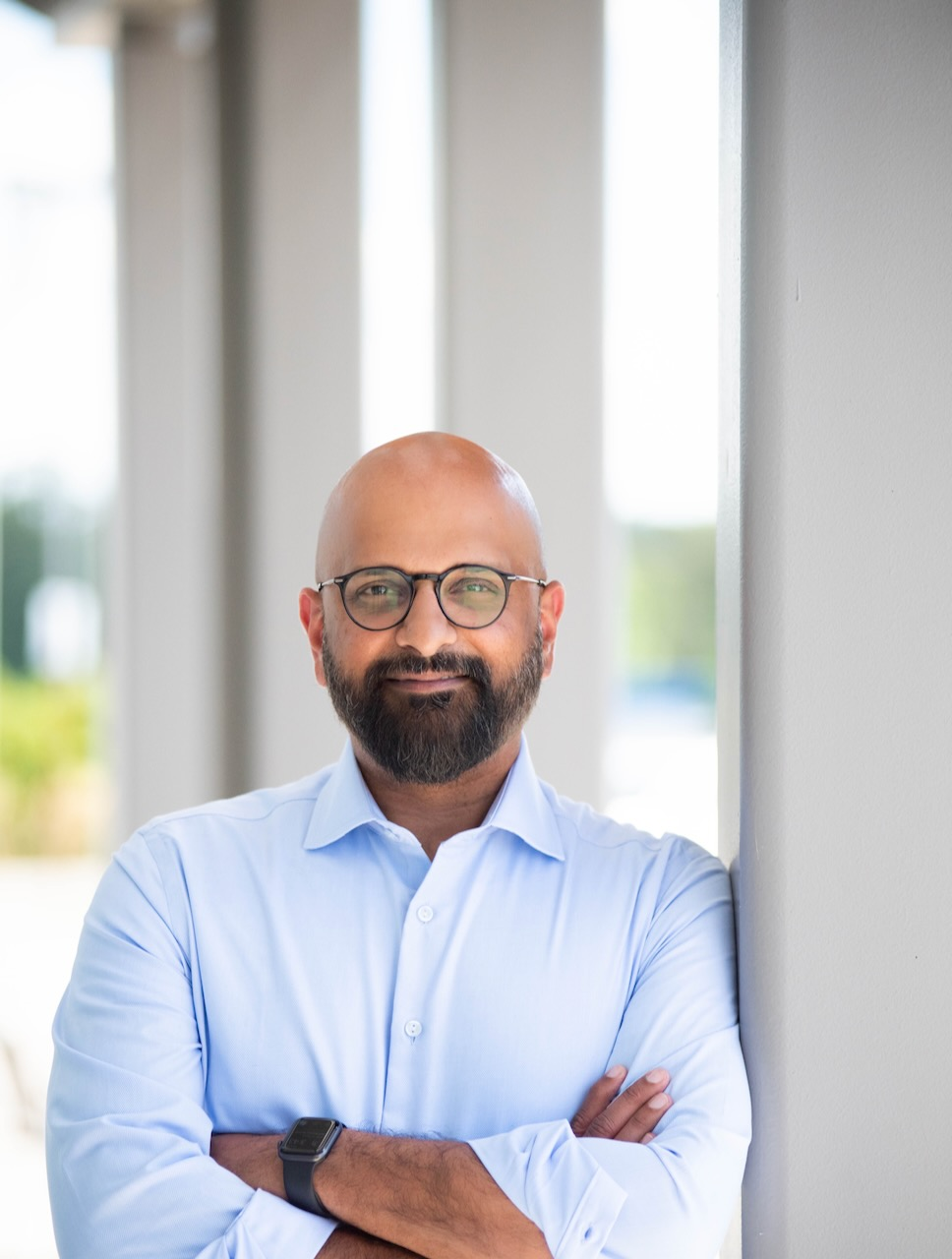
Candidate	Gord Krantz*	Zee Hamid
Popular vote	11,391	10,396
Percentage	49.51%	45.18%
Mayor before election
Gordon Krantz
Elected mayor
Gordon Krantz

Mayor Gord Krantz, the longest serving mayor of a major municipality in Canada won a combined 21st consecutive term in office (7 as councillor and 14 as mayor). He was challenged by regional councillor Zeeshan Hamid.

Candidate	Vote	%
Gord Krantz*	11,391	49.51
Zee Hamid	10,396	45.18
Rajiv Dhawan	625	2.72
Saba Ishaq	597	2.59

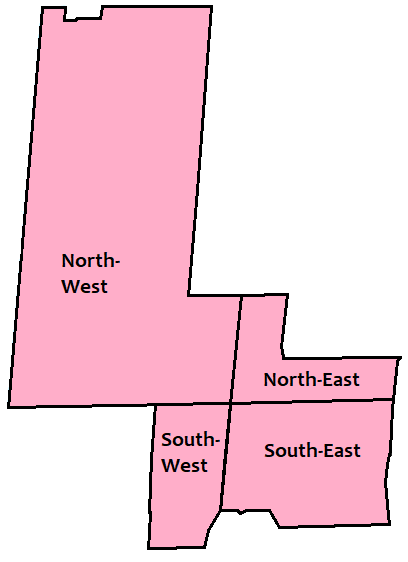
Map of Milton's four wards

=== Regional councillors ===
Four Regional Councillors are elected in 1 of 4 wards.

Candidate	Vote	%
Ward 1 (North-West)
Colin Best*	Acclaimed	
Ward 2 (North-East)
Rick Malboeuf*	Acclaimed	
Ward 3 (South-East)
Sammy Ijaz	2,182	38.13
Rick Di Lorenzo	1,827	31.93
Mike Cluett*	1,713	29.94
Ward 4 (South-West)
Sameera Ali	3,297	68.49
Mahmood Chaudhry	873	18.13
Syed Raza	644	13.38

=== Local councillors ===
Four Local Councillors are elected in 1 of 4 wards.

Candidate	Vote	%
Ward 1
Kristina Tesser Derksen*	4,200	71.54
George Minakakis	1,671	28.46
Ward 2
John Challinor*	3,542	57.54
Michael Vertolli	2,614	42.46
Ward 3
Adil Khalqi	2,067	37.20
Patricia Belvedere	1,102	19.83
Patrick Murphy	1,090	19.61
Manju Sekhri	943	16.97
Gilles Paquette	355	6.39
Ward 4
Sarah Marshall	1,041	21.37
Giles vanderHolt	860	17.66
Khurshid Ali Khan	853	17.51
Kiran Fahim Ali	640	13.14
Indu Verma	505	10.37
Saim Sohail	377	7.74
Samar Tariq	186	3.82
Tresa Ratnakumar	179	3.67
Syed Saleh Ali Hashmi	175	3.59
Mawiz Hassan	55	1.13

=== By-election ===
A by-election was held in Ward 1 on October 6, 2025 to fill the seat vacated by Kristina Tesser Derksen, who was elected to the Canadian House of Commons.

Results:

Candidate	Vote	%
George Minakakis	1,804	45.43
Rick Di Lorenzo	958	24.12
Zainab Raza	565	14.23
Zaheer Ashraf	364	9.17
Adejisola Atiba	96	2.42
Pat O'Reilly	79	1.99
Gourav Suri	51	1.28
Shahbaz Khan	29	0.73
Cecil Young	25	0.63

== Oakville ==
List of candidates:

=== Mayor ===
2022 Oakville mayoral election
- October 24, 2022
- Turnout: 28.30%
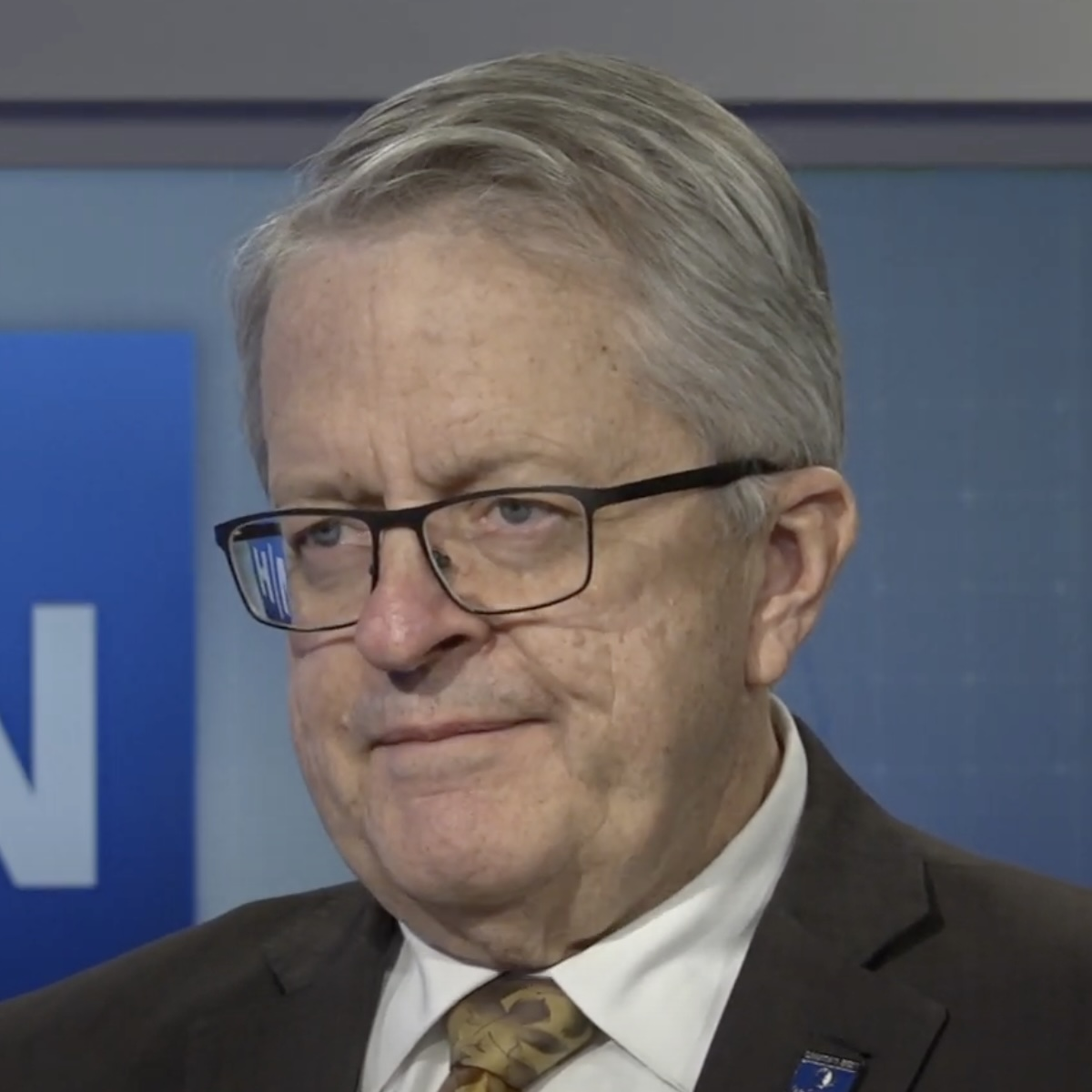
		JH
Candidate	Rob Burton*	Julia Hanna
Popular vote	19,949	19,063
Percentage	49.24%	47.06%
Mayor before election
Rob Burton
Elected mayor
Rob Burton

Mayor Rob Burton ran for re-election. It was a re-match of the 2018 mayoral race between him and Julia Hanna, a local restaurant owner and former chamber of commerce chair.

Mayoral Candidate	Vote	%
Rob Burton*	19,949	49.24
Julia Hanna	19,063	47.06
Jack Kukolic	1,498	3.70

=== Oakville Town Council ===
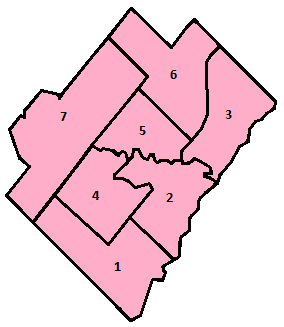
Map of Oakville's wards to be used in this election.

==== Town and regional council ====
Candidate	Vote	%
Ward 1
Sean O'Meara*	4,998	74.14
JD Meaney	1,708	25.86
Ward 2
Cathy Duddeck*	Acclaimed	
Ward 3
Janet Haslett-Theall	Acclaimed	
Ward 4
Allan Elgar*	5,806	84.68
Gilbert Jubinville	1,050	15.32
Ward 5
Jeff Knoll*	4,529	73.99
Alicia Bedford	1,592	26.01
Ward 6
Tom Adams*	Acclaimed	
Ward 7
Nav Nanda	1,984	57.71
Pavan Parmar*	1,454	42.99

==== Town council ====
Candidate	Vote	%
Ward 1
Jonathan McNeice	3,137	48.08
Beth Robertson*	2,755	42.22
John Florio	476	7.30
Oliver Vadas	157	2.41
Ward 2
Ray Chisholm*	Acclaimed	
Ward 3
Dave Gittings	4,438	83.17
Dyanne Dumas	898	16.83
Ward 4
Peter Longo*	5,465	79.63
Gordon Brennan	1,398	20.37
Ward 5
Marc Grant*	2,769	45.71
Michael Reid	1,951	32.21
Angela Parsons	970	16.01
Pierre Sauvageot	368	6.07
Ward 6
Natalia Lishchyna*	4,238	85.15
Lama Aggad	739	14.85
Ward 7
Scott Xie	820	23.25
Amir Henry	687	19.48
Ajay Rosha	482	13.67
Shahab Khan	385	10.92
Nabil Bin Arif	380	10.77
Melody Wong-Gonsalves	315	8.93
Gregory Park	293	8.31
Kashif Chaudry	126	3.57
Faryal Ghazanfar	39	1.11
