= Ann Mulvale =

Canadian politician

44th Mayor of Oakville
- In office 1988–2006
- Preceded by: P. Wm. Perras Jr.
- Succeeded by: Rob Burton

Personal details
- Born: 1949 (age 76–77) England
- Spouse: Peter Mulvale (deceased)
- Children: David (deceased) & Robert

Ann Mulvale (born 1949) is a Canadian politician. She served as mayor of Oakville, Ontario for 18 years, from 1988 to 2006. She was appointed Halton's first "Strong Regional Chair" in November 2026 by the Progressive Conservative (PC) Ford ministry.

== Municipal politics ==
Mulvale was first elected to Oakville town council and Halton regional council in 1980, during an election cycle that saw four of the six incumbent regional councillors representing Oakville going down in defeat. Mulvale and fellow Conservative Fred Oliver, defeated incumbents Ron Planche and future Liberal MP Bonnie Brown, both Liberal partisans. Mulvale and Oliver were re-elected in 1982, with Mulvale topping the local ballot in ward 3.

=== Mayoralty ===
Mulvale first contested the mayoralty in 1985 upon the retirement of 14-year incumbent Harry Barrett. She was defeated by lawyer William Perras, a former Liberal candidate in the 1984 federal election, by a thousand votes in a competitive race that featured two other fellow councillors. Three years later in 1988, Mulvale prevailed over Perras in a head-to-head re-match, defeating the one-term incumbent by over 20 points on a platform of slowing the pace of developemnt and protecting Oakville's small-town image. She faced no competition in the 1991 election, but maintained a campaign office dedicated to boost voter turnout. She was comfortably re-elected in 1994 and 1997, and was again acclaimed in 2000.

Mulvale's attitude toward development evolved over her lengthy mayoral tenure presiding over Oakville rapid growth from a small town to a bed room community of Toronto with a population over 150,000. By the 2003 election she was viewed as a firmly pro-development, pro-urban sprawl mayor. She faced a fierce challenge from prominent environmentalist Rob Burton, then executive director of the Clear the Air Coalition, and came within 15 votes (0.05%) of defeat. Her mayoral tenure ended in 2006 when she was defeated by Burton. Mulvale sought to reclaim the mayoralty in 2010 but was again defeated by Burton.

Mulvale ran for the Ward 5 regional council seat in 2014 and 2018, defeated both times by Jeff Knoll, a future mayor who would in turn end Burton two-decade long mayoralty in 2026.

=== Roles beyond Oakville while mayor ===
Mulvale became involved with the Association of Municipalities of Ontario in 1990, and served as its president from 2000 to 2002 and again from 2003 to 2004 during her final two terms as mayor. Her first term as AMO president coincided with the conclusion of the comprehensive overhaul of Ontario’s municipal legislation that led to the passage of Municipal Act, 2001.

While Oakville's mayor, Mulvale served on the Mayors' and Regional Chairs' Committee for the Greater Toronto Area and on the short-lived Greater Toronto Services Board. In February 2002 she was appointed by the Progressive Conservative government then in power to the Central Ontario Smart Growth Panel, and its Gridlock Sub-Panel. In November 2002 Mulvale joined the steering committee of the Toronto City Summit Alliance.

=== Appointed Regional Chair ===
After two decades out of public office, during which she experienced four electoral defeats, Mulvale was appointed Halton Regional Chair in November 2026 by the Progressive Conservative government. The appointment followed controversial legislative amendments that ended decades of direct elections by voters while granting the appointees “strong chair powers". Mulvale succeeded Gary Carr, a former Progressive Conservative Speaker of the legislature who was elected Regional Chair directly by voters across the four constituent municipalities in five consecutive municipal elections between 2006 and 2022. Mulvale's appointment made her the second Halton Regional Chair with no electoral mandate. The only other person named to the role was Alan Masson, another former Oakville mayor, who appointed in 1974 when the regional municipality came into existence. Every regional chair since Georgetown Reeve Ric Morrow ousted Masson in 1977 has been elected either by their regional council peers, or, since 2000, by the ratepayers.

== Federal electoral bid ==
Mulvale stood as the Progressive Conservative candidate in Oakville—Milton in the 1993 federal election. She was defeated by Liberal Bonnie Brown, an erstwhile rival Mulvale defeated in her first electoral victory in 1980.

== Not-for profit sector ==
Mulvale was employed as executive director of the United Way of Oakville in the intervening year between her first mayoral bid and her election as mayor. She also served on the board of directors of various civic organizations.

== Personal life ==
Ann Mulvale was born in England in 1949. She emigrated to Canada in 1969, settling in Oakville in 1972. She was married to Peter Mulvale (deceased 1995) with whom she had two children, David and Robert.

== Electoral Record ==
=== 1980, 1982: Halton Regional Council & Oakville Town Council ===
1980 Oakville Town election Regional Councillors, Ward 3 two to be elected
Candidate	Votes	%
Fred Oliver	2,725	29.17
Ann Mulvale	2,515	26.92
Ron Planche (X)	2,074	22.20
Bonnie Brown (X)	2,028	21.71
Total valid votes	9,342	
Source: Toronto Star

1982 Oakville Town election Regional Councillors, Ward 3 two to be elected
Candidate	Votes	%
Ann Mulvale (X)	3,861	34.66
Fred Oliver (X)	2,962	26.59
Ron Planche	1,966	17.65
Archie Donaghey	1,511	13.56
Douglas Bagg	839	7.53
Total valid votes	11,139	
Source: Toronto Star

=== 1993 federal election ===
1993 Canadian federal election: Oakville—Milton
Party	Candidate	Votes	%	±%
Liberal	Bonnie Brown	34,273		
Progressive Conservative	Ann Mulvale	19,153		
Reform	Richard Malboeuf	17,251		
New Democratic Party	Willie Lambert	1,756		
Natural Law	Harry Bright	543		
Independent	Ken Campbell	432		

=== 1985–2010 Oakville mayor ===
1985 Oakville Town election - Mayor
Candidate	Votes	%
Bill Perras	7,943	33.98
Ann Mulvale *	6,848	29.30
Carol Gooding *	3,909	16.72
Jackie Cutmore *	3,894	16.66
Blake Taylor	782	3.35
Total valid votes	23,376	
* incumbent councillors Source: Globe and Mail

1988 Oakville Town election - Mayor
Candidate	Votes	%
Ann Mulvale	18,636	61.89
Bill Perras (X)	11,476	38.11
Total valid votes	23,376	
Voter turnout	42%	
Source: Toronto Star

1991 Oakville Town election - Mayor
Candidate	Votes	%
Ann Mulvale (X)	accl.	
Source: Hamilto Spectator

1994 Oakville Town election - Mayor
Candidate	Votes	%
Ann Mulvale (X)	18,003	67.31
Ed Schuermer	8,743	32.69
Total valid votes	26,746	
Source: Hamilton Spectator

1997 Oakville Town election - Mayor
Candidate	Votes	%
Ann Mulvale (X)	21,605	77.90
David Bazar	6,130	22.10
Total valid votes	27,735	
Source: Hamilton Spectator

2000 Oakville Town election - Mayor
Candidate	Votes	%
Ann Mulvale (X)	accl.	
Source: Globe and Mail

2003 Oakville Town election - Mayor
Candidate	Votes	%
Ann Mulvale (X)	15,731	49.13
Rob Burton	15,716	49.08
Richard Serra	573	1.79
Total valid votes	32,020	
Source: Hamilton Spectator

2006 Oakville Town election - Mayor
Candidate	Votes	%
Rob Burton	15,120	38.36
Ann Mulvale (X)	13,484	34.21
Chris Stoate	7,409	18.08
Janice Wright	3,096	7.85
Daniela Z. Giecewicz	309	0.78

2010 Oakville Town election - Mayor
Mayoral Candidate	Vote	%
Rob Burton (X)	25,107	52.28%
Ann Mulvale	20,269	42.21%
John McLaughlin	2,083	4.34%
Raymond Ray	563	1.17%

=== 2018, 2022: Halton Regional Council & Oakville Town Council ===
2014 Oakville Town election - Ward 5
Candidate	Votes	%
Jeff Knoll	3,846	48.84
Ann Mulvale	3,706	47.06
Hugh Boyd	323	4.10

2018 Oakville Town election - Ward 5
Candidate	Votes	%
Jeff Knoll (X)	4,866	62.07
Ann Mulvale	2,752	35.11
Sheena Sandhu	221	2.82

== See also ==
- List of mayors of Oakville, Ontario
