= Rob Burton =

Canadian politician and businessman

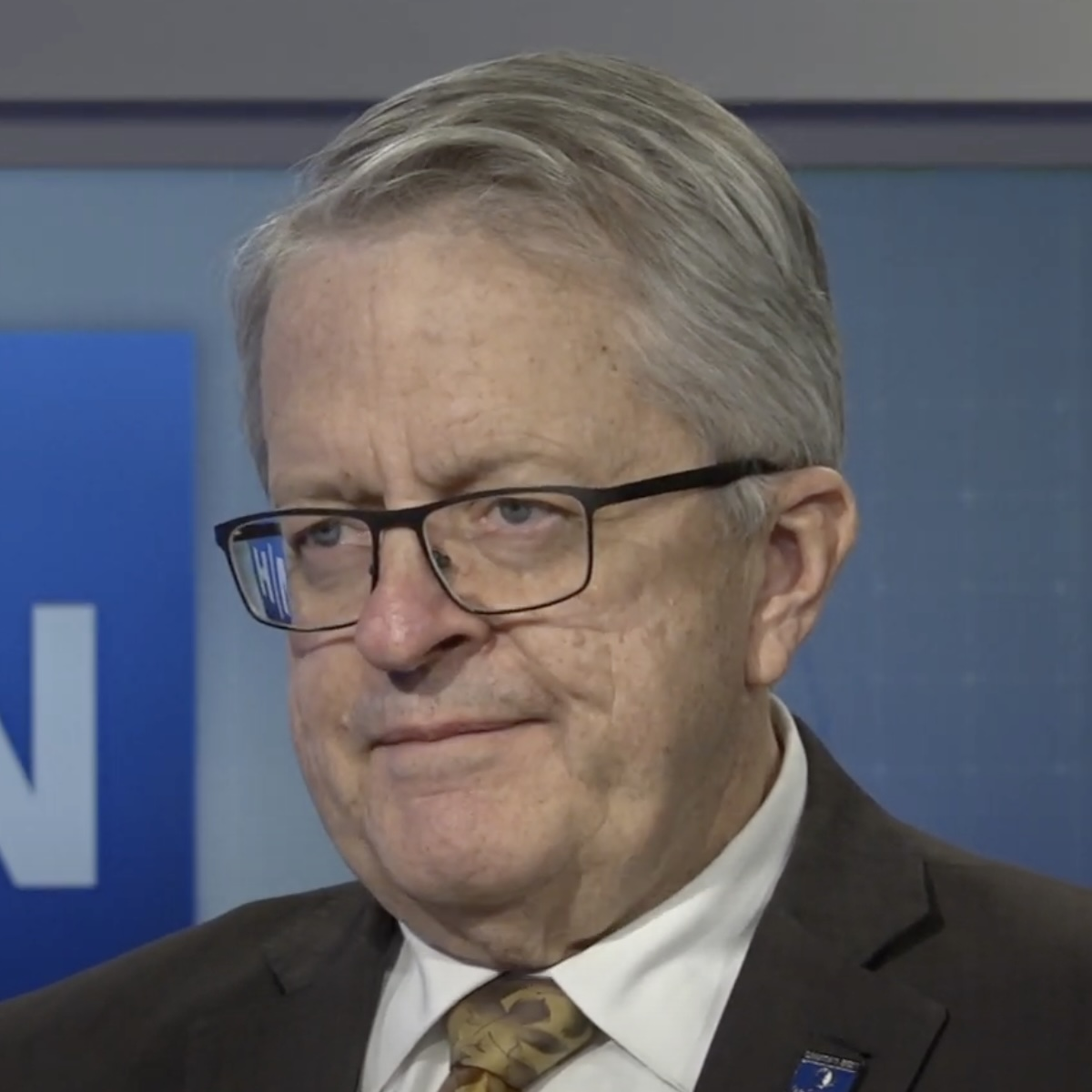
- Burton in 2018

45th Mayor of Oakville
- In office November 13, 2006 – November 15, 2026
- Preceded by: Ann Mulvale
- Succeeded by: Jeff Knoll

Personal details
- Born: Robert Burton
- Party: Independent
- Spouse: Wendy Burton
- Education: University of New Mexico; Columbia University (MS)
- Website: www.robburton.ca

Rob Burton (born c. 1946) is a Canadian businessman, journalist and politician. He tly served as the 45th mayor of Oakville, Ontario, Canada from 2006 to 2026. He was elected in the municipal election of 2006, having failed to unseat Ann Mulvale in 2003. He was re-elected to office in the 2010, 2014, 2018 and 2022 municipal elections.

== Early career and education ==
Burton graduated from the University of New Mexico with a degree in history and economics before receiving a Master's of Science in Journalism from Columbia University.

After receiving his master's degree in 1971, he became a journalist for the Watertown Daily Times in New York State. He was recruited shortly after by CBC to help establish their new consumer rights programme Marketplace. He worked as a journalist and television producer until 1988, when he led the creation of the youth-focused television station YTV. After founding the station, he went on to work as the general manager and vice-president of programming and production.

== Political career ==
=== Electoral history ===
Burton first ran for mayor in 2003. Up against five-term incumbent Ann Mulvale, Burton ultimately lost his first bid for mayor by a total of 28 votes. Burton ran again in 2006, managing to unseat Mulvale by a nearly 2000-vote margin. Mulvale challenged Burton for the mayorship once again in 2010, but was soundly defeated by over 4000 votes. In the 2014 election, Burton won with about two-thirds of the vote. He was strongly endorsed by the Toronto Star editorial board. He was re-elected with a plurality in 2018. Rob Burton won re-election in 2022 by a narrow margin. In 2026, Burton placed third, ending his nearly two-decade long tenure as mayor.

=== Mayorship ===
In his time as mayor, Burton has been an outspoken advocate for growth control, environmental protection and greenspace. He is a vocal supporter of Ontario's Greenbelt, founding the "Municipal Leaders for the Greenbelt" alongside Ajax Mayor Steve Parrish and Toronto Councillor Glenn de Baeremaker, which he still chairs today. He is a vocal critic of Ontario's development industry, describing large developers as a 'cartel' in 2017, after suggestions that developers wanted to ease planning restrictions and greenspace protections to improve housing affordability.

In 2015, Burton apologized for a series of tweets comparing Stephen Harper's use of veterans in the Canadian Corps of Commissionaires to Mussolini's Blackshirts and Hitler's Brownshirts.

Burton is the founder and chair of the Ontario Auto Mayors, a group of municipal leaders in communities with a large automotive manufacturing presence, advocating for more coordinated support of Ontario's automotive sector among all three levels of government. He has also served as the Chair of the Halton Police Services Board since 2014.

== See also ==
- List of mayors of Oakville, Ontario
