= Marianne Meed Ward =

Mayor of Burlington, Ontario, since 2018

Her Worship Marianne Meed Ward
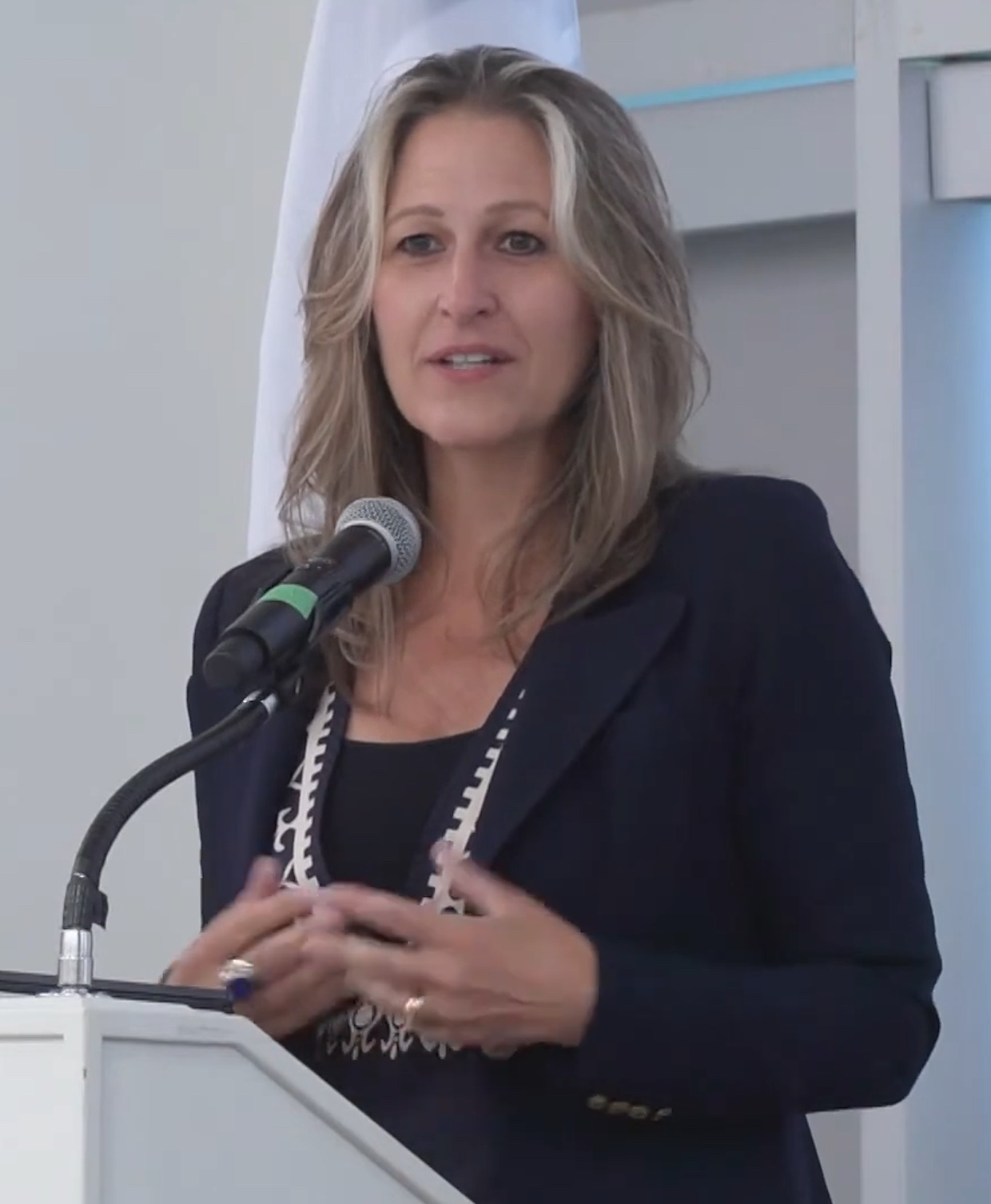
- Meed Ward in 2022

29th Mayor of Burlington
- Incumbent
- Assumed office December 1, 2018
- Preceded by: Rick Goldring

Burlington City Councillor for Ward 2
- In office December 1, 2010 – November 30, 2018
- Preceded by: Peter Thoem
- Succeeded by: Lisa Kearns
- Constituency: Ward 2

Personal details
- Born: Marianne Meed; January 4, 1966 (age 60) Greeley, Colorado, U.S.
- Party: Independent
- Other political affiliations: Ontario Liberal
- Spouse: Peter Ward
- Children: 3
- Education: Carleton University (BJ)
- Profession: Politician; journalist
- Website: Official website; Mayor's Office

Marianne Meed Ward (née Meed; born January 4, 1966) is an American-born Canadian politician and former journalist serving as the 29th and current mayor of Burlington since December 3, 2018. She represented Ward 2 in the Burlington City Council for two terms, from 2010 to 2018.

== Early life and education ==
Born in Greeley, Colorado, to a Canadian father and American mother, Meed Ward grew up in Kingston, Ontario and Toronto before moving to Ottawa where she earned a Bachelor of Journalism from Carleton University in 1989.

== Career in media ==
Meed Ward worked for Faith Today magazine from 1989, becoming managing editor in 1996. She resigned her position in February 1999 following a 'change in direction' at the magazine. She launched her own communications business, Meed Ward Media, providing writing, editorial, consulting or teaching services to a range of clients including Chatelaine, Vision TV, Ryerson University, Tyndale College, CHCH TV, Crossroads Communications, and the Toronto Sun where she served as a weekly columnist covering faith and ethics, and later covering the 905 area of the Greater Toronto Area. She stood down from the position to contest the 2010 election.

== Career in politics ==
Meed Ward first entered politics by running for Ward 1 councillor in the 2006 municipal election, losing to Rick Craven. In 2007, she ran as the Ontario Liberal Party candidate for Burlington, coming second to PC candidate Joyce Savoline by only 1824 votes, and receiving 37.81% of the vote. After 2007, Meed Ward returned to journalism, before deciding to run for election municipally. After moving to downtown Burlington (Ward 2), she ran for municipal council again in 2010, defeating incumbent Peter Thoem. She was re-elected in 2014, before running in 2018 for mayor, where she defeated two-term incumbent Mayor Rick Goldring.

== Mayor of Burlington ==
Meed Ward was up against two-term incumbent Rick Goldring and former Burlington MP, Mike Wallace. She campaigned on stopping overdevelopment in Burlington, specifically downtown. She had also campaigned on addressing traffic congestion, flood risk, protecting the city's tree canopy, tax reform and building trust between the community and council. Meed Ward won the 2018 municipal election with 23,360 votes and receiving 46.04% of the vote. In December 2018, the Ontario Provincial Police laid criminal charges against a third-party advertiser for alleged election spending violations in an advertising campaign targeting Meed Ward. By April 2022, all charges had been withdrawn.

In October 2022, Meed Ward was re-elected for a second term, winning 77.95% of the popular vote and receiving almost 25,000 more votes than the runner-up. She ran on a platform for reasonable development, adding more community centres and parks, and cutting red tape. Less than 28% of eligible voters participated in the 2022 election, down from almost 40% in the 2018 election.

2022 Burlington municipal election: Mayor
| Candidate | Votes | % |
|---|---|---|---|
| Marianne Meed Ward (X) | 30,135 | 77.95% |
| Jim Kerr | 5,194 | 13.43% |
| Anne Marsden | 1,636 | 4.23% |
| Steve Rieck | 1,113 | 2.88% |
| William Tuck | 583 | 1.51% |
| Majority | 24,941 | — |
| Turnout | 38,661 | — | — |

Meed Ward is the current Chair of the Ontario Big City Mayors caucus (OBCM), composed of Ontario city mayors with populations of 100,000 or more who collectively represent nearly 70% of Ontario’s population.

== Personal life ==
Meed Ward currently resides in Burlington with her husband Peter and their three children.
