= Municipal Act, 2001 =

Law outlining the governance of municipalities in Ontario

The Municipal Act, 2001 (French: Loi de 2001 sur les municipalités) of the Canadian province of Ontario is the main statute governing the creation, administration and government of municipalities in Ontario, other than the City of Toronto. After being passed in 2001, it came into force on 1 January 2003, replacing the previous Municipal Act. It has since been amended. Previous versions of the Municipal Act date back to the 19th century.

This act and others before as Municipal (Corporation) Act are linked back to Baldwin Act, 1849 of Upper Canada, which replaced the ineffective District Council Act by the establishment of responsible (elected) government.

== Functions ==
There are complex rules as to which municipalities have authority to act on any given subject, which are summarized as follows in Section 11:

11.(1) A lower-tier municipality and an upper-tier municipality may provide any service or thing that the municipality considers necessary or desirable for the public, subject to the rules set out in subsection (4).

(2) A lower-tier municipality and an upper-tier municipality may pass by-laws, subject to the rules set out in subsection (4), respecting the following matters:

1. Governance structure of the municipality and its local boards.
2. Accountability and transparency of the municipality and its operations and of its local boards and their operations.
3. Financial management of the municipality and its local boards.
4. Public assets of the municipality acquired for the purpose of exercising its authority under this or any other Act.
5. Economic, social and environmental well-being of the municipality.
6. Health, safety and well-being of persons.
7. Services and things that the municipality is authorized to provide under subsection (1).
8. Protection of persons and property, including consumer protection.

(3) A lower-tier municipality and an upper-tier municipality may pass by-laws, subject to the rules set out in subsection (4), respecting matters within the following spheres of jurisdiction:

1. Highways, including parking and traffic on highways.
2. Transportation systems, other than highways.
3. Waste management.
4. Public utilities.
5. Culture, parks, recreation and heritage.
6. Drainage and flood control, except storm sewers.
7. Structures, including fences and signs.
8. Parking, except on highways.
9. Animals.
10. Economic development services.
11. Business licensing.

(4) The following are the rules referred to in subsections (1), (2) and (3):

1. If a sphere or part of a sphere of jurisdiction is not assigned to an upper-tier municipality by the Table to this section, the upper-tier municipality does not have the power to pass by-laws under that sphere or part and does not have the power to pass by-laws under subsection (1) or (2) that, but for this paragraph, could also be passed under that sphere or part.
2. If a sphere or part of a sphere of jurisdiction is assigned to an upper-tier municipality exclusively by the Table to this section, its lower-tier municipalities do not have the power to pass by-laws under that sphere or part and do not have the power to pass by-laws under subsection (1) or (2) that, but for this paragraph, could also be passed under that sphere or part.
3. If a sphere or part of a sphere of jurisdiction is assigned to an upper-tier municipality non-exclusively by the Table to this section, both the upper-tier municipality and its lower-tier municipalities have the power to pass by-laws under that sphere or part.
4. If a lower-tier municipality has the power under a specific provision of this Act, other than this section, or any other Act to pass a by-law, its upper-tier municipality does not have the power to pass the by-law under this section.
5. If an upper-tier municipality has the power under a specific provision of this Act, other than this section, or any other Act to pass a by-law, a lower-tier municipality of the upper-tier municipality does not have the power to pass the by-law under this section.
6. Paragraphs 4 and 5 apply to limit the powers of a municipality despite the inclusion of the words “without limiting sections 9, 10 and 11” or any similar form of words in the specific provision.
7. The power of a municipality with respect to the following matters is not affected by paragraph 4 or 5, as the case may be:
  1. prohibiting or regulating the placement or erection of any sign, notice or advertising device within 400 metres of any limit of an upper-tier highway,
  2. any other matter prescribed by the Minister.

TABLE
| Sphere of jurisdiction | Part of sphere assigned | Upper-tier municipality(ies) to which part of sphere assigned | Exclusive or non-exclusive assignment |
|---|---|---|---|
| Highways, including parking and traffic on highways | Whole sphere | All upper-tier municipalities | Non-exclusive |
| Transportation systems, other than on highways | Airports | All upper-tier municipalities | Non-exclusive |
| Transportation systems, other than on highways | Ferries | All upper-tier municipalities | Non-exclusive |
| Transportation systems, other than on highways | Disabled passenger transport systems | Peel, Halton | Non-exclusive |
| Transportation systems, other than on highways | Whole sphere, except airports and ferries | Waterloo, York | Exclusive |
| Waste management | Whole sphere, except waste collection | Durham, Halton, Lambton, Oxford, Peel, Waterloo, York | Exclusive |
| Public utilities | Sewage treatment | All counties, Niagara, Waterloo, York | Non-exclusive |
| Public utilities | Sewage treatment | Durham, Halton, Muskoka, Oxford, Peel | Exclusive |
| Public utilities | Collection of sanitary sewage | All counties, Niagara, Waterloo, York | Non-exclusive |
| Public utilities | Collection of sanitary sewage | Durham, Halton, Muskoka, Oxford, Peel | Exclusive |
| Public utilities | Collection of storm water and other drainage from land | All upper-tier municipalities | Non-exclusive |
| Public utilities | Water production, treatment and storage | All upper-tier municipalities except counties | Exclusive |
| Public utilities | Water distribution | Niagara, Waterloo, York | Non-exclusive |
| Public utilities | Water distribution | Oxford, Durham, Halton, Muskoka, Peel | Exclusive |
| Culture, parks, recreation and heritage | Whole sphere | All upper-tier municipalities | Non-exclusive |
| Drainage and flood control, except storm sewers | Whole sphere | All upper-tier municipalities | Non-exclusive |
| Structures, including fences and signs | Whole sphere, except fences and signs | Oxford | Non-exclusive |
| Parking, except on highways | Municipal parking lots and structures | All upper-tier municipalities | Non-exclusive |
| Animals | None | None | |
| Economic development services | Promotion of the municipality for any purpose by the collection and dissemination of information | Durham | Exclusive |
| Economic development services | Promotion of the municipality for any purpose by the collection and dissemination of information | All counties, Halton, Muskoka, Niagara, Oxford, Peel, Waterloo, York | Non-exclusive |
| Economic development services | Acquisition, development and disposal of sites for industrial, commercial and institutional uses | Durham | Exclusive |
| Economic development services | Acquisition, development and disposal of sites for industrial, commercial and institutional uses | Halton, Lambton, Oxford | Non-exclusive |
| Business licensing | Owners and drivers of taxicabs, tow trucks, buses and vehicles (other than motor vehicles) used for hire; Taxicab brokers; Salvage business; Second-hand goods business | Niagara, Waterloo | Exclusive |
| Business licensing | Drainage business, plumbing business | York | Exclusive |
| Business licensing | Lodging houses, septic tank business | York | Non-exclusive |

== See also ==
- Metropolitan Toronto Act
- Revised Statutes of Ontario
