= Blair Lancaster =

Canadian model and politician

Burlington City Councillor for Ward 6
- In office December 1, 2010 – December 1, 2018
- Preceded by: Carol D'Amelio
- Succeeded by: Angelo Bentivegna

Personal details
- Born: May 9, 1954 (age 71) London, Ontario, Canada
- Known for: Local Public Service

Blair Lancaster is a Canadian businesswoman and politician from Burlington, Ontario. A winner of the Miss Canada pageant in 1974, she subsequently operated her own spa business in Burlington.

Lancaster was a member of the Burlington City Council from 2010 to 2018 serving two terms for Ward 6.

Preceded by Gillian Regehr	Miss Canada; 1974	Succeeded by Terry Lynne Meyer
