= Gordon Krantz =

Canadian politician (born 1937)

- Krantz in 2023

Mayor of Milton
- In office December 1, 1980 – November 15, 2026
- Preceded by: Don Gordon
- Succeeded by: George Minakakis

Personal details
- Born: April 20, 1937 (age 89) Milton, Ontario, Canada
- Party: Independent
- Spouse: Olive Krantz (m. 1958; died 2024)
- Children: 2
- Website: Official website

Gordon Krantz (born April 20, 1937) is a Canadian politician who served as the mayor of Milton from 1980 to 2026. He was first elected after serving as town councillor from 1965 to 1980. He has been re-elected for a total of 21 terms (7 as councillor and 14 as mayor). With his re-election in 2014, Krantz surpassed the retired Hazel McCallion as Ontario's longest-serving mayor on December 1, 2016, and the longest-serving mayor of a major municipality in Canada. He was re-elected by a 1,000 vote margin in the 2022 municipal election.

He was defeated by George Minakakis in the 2026 Halton Region municipal elections.

== Early life ==
Krantz owned and operated his own business Krantz Fuels (1961–1980), and served the Town of Milton as part-time firefighter (1960–1980). He was also on the Prosperity One Credit Union Board of Directors since 1971, and has held membership with the Royal Canadian Legion since 1963.

== Political career ==
As a politician, he has served the Town of Milton since first being elected as a councillor in 1965. Up until being elected mayor on November 10, 1980, he was the municipal councillor for Ward Two and had served five years as vice-chairman of the Halton Region Conservation Authority and seven years as the vice-president of the Halton Community Credit Union. On December 1, 2020 Krantz celebrated 40 years as Mayor of the Town of Milton.

Mayor Krantz has been a contributor to the Region of Halton's growth plan by serving on the Regional Municipality of Halton Council since 1980, Conservation Halton Board of Directors since 1973, Niagara Escarpment Commission for three terms and various Ad-Hoc and Standing Committees. He is a founding member and strong supporter of the Greater Toronto Marketing Alliance.

Major projects during his time as mayor include the restoration of the Town Hall facility, the Milton Leisure Centre, the 401 Industrial Park, the Mill Pond restoration, Rotary Park redevelopment, Hawthorne Village, Milton Centre for the Arts, the Milton Sports Centre, the Mattamy National Cycling Centre, the Milton Education Village, smart traffic system implementation and the Sherwood Community Centre and Library.

While Krantz believes that Halton Region will adopt a mandatory COVID-19 pandemic mask by-law, he voted against Milton taking such action at the town level. Krantz was narrowly re-elected in 2022, and was defeated in 2026.

== Personal life ==
Krantz grew up in Milton Heights alongside four sisters and two brothers. He met his wife, Olive, during his teenage years and they married in June 1958. The pair were married for 66 years before her death on December 31, 2024, at the age of 88.

The couple had two children, six grandchildren, and eight great grandchildren.

== Election results ==
2022 Milton mayoral election
Candidate	Votes	%
Gordon Krantz	11,391	49.51
Zee Hamid	10,396	45.18
Rajiv Dhawan	625	2.72
Saba Ishaq	597	2.59
Total	23,009	100.00

2018 Milton mayoral election
Candidate	Votes	%
Gordon Krantz	18,571	81.63
Mian Amir Naeem	2,306	10.14
Wasim Ahmed	1,874	8.24
Total	23,139	100.00

2014 Milton mayoral election
Candidate	Votes	%
Gordon Krantz	13,830	75.15
Stan Lazarski	2,743	14.90
Al Volpe	1,831	9.95
Total	18,404	100.00

2010 Milton mayoral election
Candidate	Votes	%
Gordon Krantz	9,262	59.79
Gerry Marsh	3,721	24.02
Al Volpe	1,355	8.75
Qadeer Shah	1,153	7.44
Total	15,491	100.00

2006 Milton mayoral election
Candidate	Votes	%
Gordon Krantz	6,347	53.91
Gerry Marsh	3,364	28.57
Al Volpe	2,063	17.52
Total	11,774	100.00

2003 Milton mayoral election
Candidate	Votes	%
Gordon Krantz	6,238	60.73
Rick Malboeuf	2,224	21.65
Al Volpe	701	6.82
Las Polcz	409	3.98
Vito Agozzino	369	3.59
David Lloyd	331	3.22
Total	10,272	100.00

2000 Milton mayoral election
Candidate	Votes	%
Gordon Krantz	7,414	81.83
Vito Agozzino	1,646	18.17
Total	9,060	100.00

1997 Milton mayoral election
Candidate	Votes	%
Gordon Krantz	5,111	55.82
Colin Best	4,046	44.18
Total	9,157	100.00

1994 Milton mayoral election
Candidate	Votes	%
Gordon Krantz	7,332	83.83
David Lloyd	735	8.40
Glenn Botting	679	7.76
Total	8,746	100.00

1991 Milton mayoral election
Candidate	Votes	%
Gordon Krantz	Acclaimed	N/A
Total	Acclaimed	N/A

1988 Milton mayoral election
Candidate	Votes	%
Gordon Krantz	Acclaimed	N/A
Total	Acclaimed	N/A

1985 Milton mayoral election
Candidate	Votes	%
Gordon Krantz	Acclaimed	N/A
Total	Acclaimed	N/A

1982 Milton mayoral election
Candidate	Votes	%
Gordon Krantz	5,869	74.36
Gus Goutouski	2,024	25.64
Total	7,893	100.00

1980 Milton mayoral election
Candidate	Votes	%
Gordon Krantz	4,024	53.10
Donald Gordon	3,554	46.90
Total	7,578	100.00

1978 Milton Municipal Election (Ward 2 - four elected)
Candidate	Votes	%
Rose Harrison	2,823	18.79
Gordon Krantz	2,758	18.35
Terry Gibbons	2,544	16.93
Blanche Hinton	1,818	12.10
Dave de Sylva	1,781	11.85
Gordon Cartwright	1,752	11.66
Don McColeman	1,550	7.65
Total	15,026	100.00

1976 Milton Municipal Election (Ward 2 - four elected)
Candidate	Votes	%
Art Melanson	2,038	16.04
Gordon Krantz	1,977	15.56
McCready	1,862	14.66
Rose Harrison	1,293	10.18
Blanche Hinton	1,165	9.17
Gordon Cartwright	1,029	8.10
Wood	973	7.66
Lambert	931	7.33
Don McColeman	747	5.88
Russell	690	5.43
Total	12,705	100.00

1973 Milton Municipal Election (4 Councillors Elected)
Candidate	Votes	%
Jim Kerr	2,316	18.90
Art Melanson	2,266	18.49
Gordon Krantz	1,781	14.54
Ron Harris	1,755	14.32
Hazel Porter	1,624	13.25
Gordon Cartwright	1,165	9.51
Day	656	5.35
Gordon	637	5.20
Green	53	0.43
Total	12,253	100.00

1971 Milton Municipal Election (6 Councillors Elected)
Candidate	Votes	%
Art Melanson	1,185	13.24
Marjorie Powys	1,165	13.02
Sid Childs	1,123	12.55
Colin Smillie	1,018	11.38
Dr. Ivan Hunter	1,008	11.27
Gordon Krantz	978	10.93
Murray Hood	852	9.52
Charles Johnson	816	9.12
Jim Bailey	802	8.96
Total	8,947	100.00

1969 Milton Municipal Election (6 Councillors Elected)
Candidate	Votes	%
Sid Childs	1,507	17.09
Charles Fay	1,427	16.19
Art Melanson	1,422	16.13
Gordon Krantz	1,361	15.44
Charles Johnson	1,123	12.74
William Woods	1,054	11.96
Frank Miller	922	10.46
Total	8,816	100.00

1967 Milton Municipal Election (6 Councillors Elected)
Candidate	Votes	%
R. McCuaig	1,149	12.92
C. Smillie	1,132	12.73
C. Fay	1,054	11.86
B. Ferguson	966	10.87
P. Barr	920	10.35
G. Krantz	873	9.82
M. Kernighan	871	9.80
C. Johnson	812	9.13
J. Hopkins	509	5.73
J. Wanless	307	3.45
R. Drennan	297	3.34
Total	8,890	100.00

1965 Milton Municipal Election (6 Councillors Elected)
Candidate	Votes	%
Charles Fay	1,165	18.57
Brian Best	1,052	16.76
Percy Barr	998	15.90
Charles Johnson	904	14.41
Gordon Krantz	837	13.34
Tony Cousens	665	10.60
Andy Meechan	654	10.42
Total	6,275	100.00
