= William Francis Romain (politician) =

2nd Mayor of Oakville
- In office 1863–1865
- Preceded by: George King Chisholm
- Succeeded by: Robert Kerr Chisholm

Personal details
- Born: July 15, 1818 Quebec City

William Francis Romain (July 15, 1818 – after 1869) was a Canadian businessman and politician. He was a grain merchant and served as reeve of Trafalgar Township as well as serving on the town council and as mayor of Oakville, Ontario.

Romain was born in Quebec City to parents Pere and Elizabeth Romain and was one of eight children in the family. He became the first postmaster of Brampton where he was also a grain dealer. He then moved to Oakville, and in 1847 married Esther Ann Chisolm, the daughter of William Chisholm. Romain purchased land from George King Chisholm for development but kept some lakefront property for his own home which he lost in 1869 due to bankruptcy. His home eventually became the Lakehurst Sanitarium in 1895.

Romain served for two years as the reeve of Trafalgar Township, and then served on the Oakville town council. He was elected as mayor of Oakville from 1863 to 1865.

== See also ==
- List of mayors of Oakville, Ontario
