= Oakville Symphony Orchestra =

Oakville Symphony
- Orchestra
- Founded: 1967
- Location: Oakville, Ontario, Canada
- Concert hall: Oakville Centre for the Performing Arts
- Principal conductor: Lorenzo Guggenheim
- Website: www.oakvillesymphony.com

The Oakville Symphony is a Canadian orchestra performing in Oakville, Ontario.

== History ==
The Oakville Symphony was founded in 1967 by Kenneth Hollier, a local musician and educator with the original mission statement to "make music for the pleasure of its members and the enjoyment of its audience". The Oakville Symphony currently performs at the Oakville Centre for the Performing Arts.

In 1968, a small group met for the first rehearsal in a music room at T. A. Blakelock High School, among which a few members still perform with the orchestra today. The newly formed orchestra's first performance was held at the YMCA on June 24, 1968.

The Oakville Symphony has a long history of presenting collaborations with local groups including the Oakville Symphony Youth Orchestra, White Oaks Choral Society, the Clarkson Opera Society, the Oakville School of Ballet, the Oakville Children's Choir and the Oakville Suzuki Association.

From 1998 to 2020, the Oakville Symphony was under the direction of Roberto De Clara. Initiatives such as the Young Artist Awards, a Family Christmas Concert and a Young People's Concert plus a program of community outreach called Meet a Musician and the maestro's popular Not Just the Score talks have ensured that audiences of all ages are reached in the community.

The Oakville Symphony has a loyal base of subscribers for its main concert series which takes place on four weekends a season with two performances of each concert which are close to sold-out. The Orchestra attracts guest soloists of international renown who enjoy the warmth of the welcome from musicians and patrons alike. A review of pianist Christopher Goodpasture's performance of Grieg's Concerto for Piano in A minor with the OS stated, "The orchestra seemed to understand that this was a very special performance and rose to the challenge with its best work. The communication between soloist, orchestra and conductor was akin to that of a chamber ensemble."

Since July 2022, the current Music Director has been Lorenzo Guggenheim.

Over 80 musicians play regularly with the orchestra, eleven of them are paid professionals who lead sections and mentor the high school students in the Young Artist program.

For the 2025/2026 season, the orchestra performs the following repertoire:

Composer	Repertoire
Angélica Negrón	Moriviví (Canadian Premiere)
Ludwig van Beethoven	Triple Concerto
Modest Mussorgsky / Maurice Ravel	Pictures at an Exhibition
Franz Schreker	Symphonic Interlude from Der Schatzgräber (Canadian Premiere)
Franz Liszt	Piano Concerto No. 1
Sergei Rachmaninoff	Symphony No. 2
Florence Price	Suite of Dances (Canadian Premiere)
Jean Sibelius	Violin Concerto
Pyotr Ilyich Tchaikovsky	Symphony No. 5
George Gershwin	An American in Paris
Bohuslav Martinů	Rhapsody Concerto for Viola and Orchestra
Nino Rota	Bassoon Concerto (Ontario Premiere)
John Williams	Star Wars Suite

For the 2024/2025 season, the orchestra performed the following repertoire:

Composer	Repertoire
Gabriela Ortiz	Kauyumari (Canadian Premiere)
Johannes Brahms	Violin Concerto
Amy Beach	Gaelic Symphony
Johannes Brahms	Intermezzo op. 118 No. 2 (Arranged for Orchestra)
Frédéric Chopin	Piano Concerto No. 1
Sergei Prokofiev	Selections from Romeo and Juliet
John Williams	Music from Star Wars, Superman, Indiana Jones and E.T. the Extra-Terrestrial
Samuel Barber	Mutations from Bach
Wolfgang Amadeus Mozart	Piano Concerto No. 23
Henri Tomasi	Trumpet Concerto
Igor Stravinsky	Suite from The Firebird
Ludwig van Beethoven	Symphony No. 8
Giacomo Puccini	"Quando me'n vo'" from La bohème
Giacomo Puccini	"O mio babbino caro" from Gianni Schicchi
Charles Gounod	"Je veux vivre" from Roméo et Juliette
Howard Levy	Diatonic Harmonica Concerto (Canadian Premiere)
Astor Piazzolla	Oblivion
Dave Brubeck	Blue Rondo à la Turk (Arranged for Orchestra)
Arturo Marquez	Danzón No. 2

== Premiere performances ==
- Anna Clyne: PIVOT (2021), Canadian premiere in November 2022
- Jessie Montgomery: Overture (2022), Canadian premiere in November 2023
- Leokadiya Kashperova: Symphony in B minor, Canadian Premiere in April 2024
- Gabriela Ortiz: Kauyumari (2021), Canadian Premiere in November 2024
- Howard Levy: Diatonic Harmonica Concerto (2002), Canadian Premiere in May 2025

== Notable performances ==
Performer	Date	Repertoire	Composer	Conductor	Reference
Scott St. John (Violin) and Sharon Wei (Viola)	April 8 - 9, 2017	Sinfonia Concertante for Violin, Viola and Orchestra	Wolfgang Amadeus Mozart	Roberto De Clara	
Timothy Chooi	November 4 - 5, 2017	Violin Concerto No. 1	Max Bruch	Roberto De Clara	
Yehonatan Berick (Violin) and Rachel Mercer (Cello)	May 12 - 13, 2018	Double Concerto	Johannes Brahms	Roberto De Clara	
N/A	Nov 6 - 7, 2021	Various	Various	Martin MacDonald	
Jonathan Crow	Feb 10 - 11, 2024	Violin Concerto No. 2	Béla Bartók	Lorenzo Guggenheim	

== See also ==
- List of symphony orchestras
- Canadian classical music
