= Indus Refinery Project =

Defunct Petroleum Refinery Project

Indus Refinery
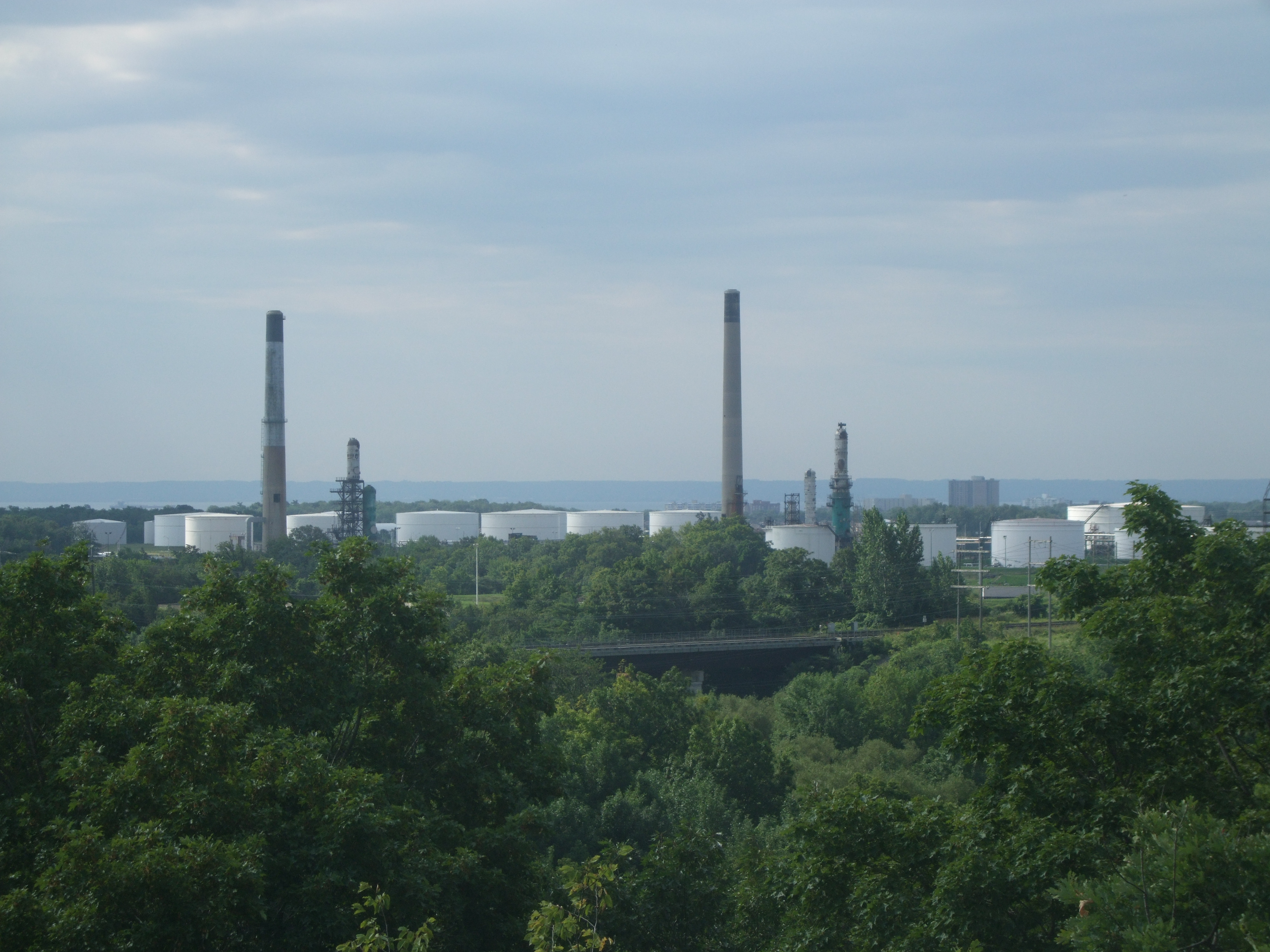
- Original Petro-Canada Oakville refinery prior to dismantling
- Interactive map of Indus Refinery
- Location: Karachi, Pakistan; 24°47′0″N 67°22′0″E

Refinery details
- Operator: Indus Refinery Limited
- Owner: Indus Refinery Limited
- Opened: 2004
- Closed: Project dormant
- Capacity: 93,000 barrels per day (14,800 m^{3}/d)

Indus Refinery Project was a petroleum refinery which was proposed to be established near Karachi, Sindh, Pakistan by Indus Refinery Limited (IRL).

== History ==
IRL began in 2004 as a proposal to buy, disassemble, and move a petroleum refinery from Canada to Pakistan, for use in supplying Pakistan with refined petroleum products, with investment from both Middle Eastern, Pakistani, US, and UK sponsors and investors. In September 2006 it was announced that a memorandum of understanding had been signed between IRL and Fauji Oil Terminal Company to open an additional oil jetty at Port Qasim to serve the refinery.

In April 2007 it was announced that work on the refinery was due to start in the following month (May 2007). The refinery was originally due to be commissioned in the first quarter of 2009. The refinery was, at this point, predicted to cost US$750 million to build, and would have led to a 35% increase in Pakistan's refining capacity, with a then-predicted capacity of 126,000 barrels per day.

The total amount of components to be shipped from Canada to Pakistan for the project was roughly 100,000 cubic metres. Whilst by June 2007 65% of the plant had been shipped from Canada to Pakistan for assembly, further shipments of refinery components did not take place. Ultimately the components remaining in Canada were auctioned to pay off haulier firms and other service providers.

By March 2008 a year's the delay in the completion of the project had been announced. The CEO of IRL, Sohail Shamsi, ascribed this to political instability in Pakistan and terrorist attacks deterring investment. The original Canadian plant, based in Oakville, that had been disassembled had also been criticised for polluting the environment, and had been closed by its owners, Petro Canada, partly because of more stringent standards in sulphur content of petroleum products. At this point, the forecast output of the plant was 93,000 barrels per day. The predicted cost of the refinery had increased to US$900 million. A subsequent plan to increase capacity to 133,000 barrels was shelved.

In October 2009 it was announced that work on the refinery had stopped entirely. It was announced that this was due to investors pulling out due to increased political risk in the wake of the assassination of Benazir Bhutto and the subsequent downgrading of Pakistan's credit rating. The refinery was "half-built" at this point according to the CEO of IRL.

In August 2010 Sohail Shamsi announced that new Chinese investors had been found to support construction of the plant. In July 2011, Shamsi announced that the Chinese investors had pulled out of investing in the plant. In July 2013 Shamsi announced renewed interest in the project from German investors.

By October 2013 the company was described as "dormant for years". Ryan Cornelius, the British owner of the principal investor company, Bahrain-based PSI Energy Holding Company, was at this time jailed under charges in Dubai that he and six other co-accused had allegedly diverted trade financing worth $501 million from the Dubai Islamic Bank to "extravagant projects", though he maintained that this money had been spent on the IRL project. At the same time, Cornelius was involved in a legal battle in Pakistan over ownership of IRL, in which he claimed he had lost an 80% stake due to a sale of shares that had occurred whilst he had been in jail and unable to vote as a shareholder. Sohail Shamsi maintained that 87% of the refinery belonged to him. In 2018, Cornelius was sentenced to an additional 20 years in jail in relation to the charges on top of the ten he had served since 2008.

== See also ==
- List of oil refineries
- Pakistan Refinery Limited
- Pak-Arab Refinery
- Attock Refinery
- TransAsia Gas International
