= List of mayors of Oakville, Ontario =

This is a list of mayors of Oakville, Ontario.

Mayors of Oakville, Ontario
Dates	Mayor
1857–1862	George King Chisholm
1863–1865	William Francis Romain
1866	Robert Kerr Chisholm
1867–1870	John Barclay
1871–1872	William McCraney
1873	George King Chisholm
1874–1882	P. A. McDougald
1883–1887	Geo. Andrew
1888–1891	John Urquhart
1892	G. Andrew
1893	Thos. Patterson
1894	W. H. Young
1895	C. G. Marlatt
1896–1897	W. H. Young
1898–1899	J. Urquhart
1900	Hedley Shaw
1901–1903	J. Kelley
1904–1905	W. H. Robinson
1906–1907	J. Kelley
1908–1909	W. S. Davis
1910–1912	George Hillmer
1913	I. T. Madden
1914–1915	W. E Featherstone
1916–1918	C. H. Cross
1919–1921	W. S. Davis
1922–1924	A. S. Forster
1925–1928	W. N. Robinson
1929	T.A. Blakelock
1930–1932	J. B. Moat
1933–1939	G. B. Jacobs
1940	James L. Hewson
1941–1944	F. M Dean S.
1945–1946	J. M. Campbell
1947	C. V. Hillmer
1948	A. E. Whitaker
1948	C.V. Hillmer
1949–1953	J. R. Black
1954–1955	Lachlan McArthur
1956–1963	William Anderson
1964–1965	Allan Morrison Masson
1966–1972	F. McLean Anderson
1973–1985	B. H. Barrett
1985–1988	P. Wm. Perras Jr.
1988–2006	Ann Mulvale
2006–2026	Rob Burton
2026-Present	Jeff Knoll
