= Harry Barrett =

B. H. Barrett

Mayor of Oakville
- In office 1973–1985
- Preceded by: F. McLean Anderson
- Succeeded by: P. William Perras Jr.

Personal details
- Born: 10 October 1925 Oakville, Ontario, Canada
- Died: 30 November 2018 (aged 93) Oakville, Ontario, Canada
- Occupation: Mayor, Plumber

Bertram Henry 'Harry' Barrett (10 October 1925 – 30 November 2018) served a number of positions in the Oakville municipal government in Ontario, Canada, eventually being elected mayor of Oakville in 1973 and serving in the position until 1985. Barrett, a plumber by trade, is widely remembered for his centred, pragmatic stance on issues, and influence in the development of the Oakville waterfront.

He died on the morning of 30 November 2018 at his home in Oakville at the age of 93.

== See also ==
- List of mayors of Oakville, Ontario
