= George King Chisholm =

George King Chisholm (September 4, 1814 – April 14, 1874) was a political figure and the first mayor of Oakville, Ontario.

George was born in Nelson Township in Upper Canada in 1814, the eldest son of William Chisholm, and was educated at Gore District grammar school in Hamilton, and Upper Canada College in Toronto. In 1840, Chisholm married Isabella Land, the granddaughter of Robert Land, founder of Hamilton, where they lived until moving to Oakville in 1849.

Chisholm served as a captain in the 2nd Regiment of the Gore Militia in 1830 and saw active service during the Upper Canada Rebellion in 1837. When the Gore Militia was abolished in 1849, the militia of Halton County was reorganized into battalions, and Chisholm became major of the 1st Battalion of Halton (formerly the 2nd Gore). In 1857, he was promoted to lieutenant-colonel and placed in command of the 1st Battalion. During the Fenian Raids, he stationed companies to guard the shores of Lake Ontario. In 1866, he went to Fort Erie with 52 men but arrived too late to participate as the Fenians had already escaped Canada.

George served as reeve of Trafalgar Township from 1830 to 1852. In 1841, he was appointed serjeant-at-arms for the Legislative Assembly of the Province of Canada. George's duties included removing disorderly people from the house. In 1849, he was injured during riots when the Rebellion Losses Bill was passed in Montreal. After resigning in 1854, he was elected to represent Halton in the legislative assembly. When the town of Oakville was incorporated in 1857, Chisholm was elected as the first mayor, serving until 1862; he served another term in 1873.

Chisholm was also named a trustee of the Halton County Grammar School, later becoming chairman of Board of Education, and formed the Oakville Agricultural Association.

On April 13, 1874, George suffered a stroke and was taken to his brother Robert Kerr Chisholm's house, where he died the next day after failing to regain consciousness.

His brother Robert Kerr Chisholm also served as the mayor of Oakville in 1866.

== See also ==
- List of mayors of Oakville, Ontario
