= Oakville Children's Choir =

Canadian children's choir

The Oakville Children's Choir is an internationally recognized multi-level community children’s choir that provides children in the Oakville, Ontario community with music education, leadership development and performance opportunities. The organization has six choirs composed of children between the ages of 5 and 18, under the artistic direction of Sarah Morrison.

== History ==
The OCC was created in May 1994 by Glenda Crawford assuming the position as founder and director. The organization began with 40 children with its first rehearsal on September 12, 1994. There were two choirs, a Senior Choir of 25 choristers from grades 4 to 8 and a Cherub Choir with 15 children from grades 1 to 3. The first concert was attended by the Mayor of Oakville, Ann Mulvale, on December 11, 1994.

In 1995, the OCC is incorporated as a non-profit organization. They released their first CD in 2001 and subsequent CDs in 2004 (Celebrating 10 Years), and 2005 (Place of the Blest).

In 2006, Sarah Morrison took over artistic responsibilities for the organization.

== Awards and recognition ==
=== 2013–2014 ===
- At the 8th World Choir Games in Riga, Latvia, the OCC Senior Choir won a Gold Medal in the Youth Choir of Equal Voices category, Champion level and the OCC Chamber Choir won a Silver Medal in the Musica Sacra category, Champion level.

=== 2012–2013 ===
- Choir won 'Best Arts Group Award' at the 2012 Cogeco Stars Among Us awards hosted by the Oakville Arts Council.

=== 2011–2012 ===
- OCC Senior and Chamber Choirs earn Gold Standings at The 2012 World Choir Games, held in Cincinnati USA July 4–14, 2012. In total, 362 choirs from 64 countries and 15,000 participants took part in the event which is among the largest choral festivals and competitions in the world.

=== 2010–2011 ===
- Sarah Morrison wins Leslie Bell Prize for Choral Conducting.
- Senior Choir wins Peel Festival, invited to MusicFest national festival, places 2nd in Provincial competition.

=== 2009–2010 ===
- Senior Chamber wins 3 silver medals at International Choral Festival of Preveza, Greece.

=== 2007–2008 ===
- Boy Choir attained Gold-Medal standing at the Kiwanis Music Festival.

=== 2005–2006 ===
- Guest artist Mary Lou Fallis hosts Christmas concert.

=== 2004–2005 ===
- OCC performs at ACDA National Convention in Los Angeles, California.
- Dinah Christie participates in the Christmas Concert.

=== 2003–2004 ===
- Senior Choir received both a gold medal in the children's choir category, and a silver medal in the Folksong category in Bremen, Germany for the Choir Olympics.
- National finalist in the CBC Choral competition - both in the Chamber and Children's categories.
- The Elmer Iseler Singers joined the OCC for the Christmas Concert.

=== 2002–2003 ===
- Chamber Choir competes in Hungary and qualifies for Choir Olympics.
- Chamber Choir receives gold standing in Budapest.
- Ron MacLean of Hockey Night in Canada was the guest host at the Community Carol Concert.

=== 2001–2002 ===
- Susan Aglukark is the special guest at the OCC Christmas Concert.
- Senior Choir tour to International Choral Kathaumixw in Powell River, British Columbia and places 2nd in its category.
- Glenda Crawford is awarded the Queen's Jubilee Medal for creating and developing The Oakville Children's Choir.

=== 1999–2000 ===
- Senior Choir performs for Canadian Prime Minister Jean Chrétien at the Prime Minister's Dinner.
- Veronica Tennant narrates the OCC Christmas Concert.
- Mayor's Business Awards for Business and the Arts awards Glenda Crawford the Arts Leadership Award for her role as Director of The Oakville Children's Choir.

=== 1996–1997 ===
- Senior Choir performed at the Ontario Legislature Christmas Concert.
- Choir sang the National Anthems at Toronto Blue Jays game.
- Intermediate Choir places 1st at the Hamilton Kiwanis Festival.
- Participates in a performance of Carmina Burana at the Oakville Centre for the Performing Arts.

=== 1995–1996 ===
- Awarded 1st Place in the Peel Music Festival.

=== 1994–1995 ===
- Won Bach-Elgar Award at the Hamilton Kiwanis Festival.
