= John Urquhart (Canadian politician) =

Canadian politician

Ninth Mayor of Oakville
- In office 1888–1891
- Preceded by: Geo. Andrew
- Succeeded by: G. Andrew

Personal details
- Born: John Urquhart Jr. c. 1844 Oakville, Canada West
- Died: December 17, 1933 (aged 88–89) Oakville, Ontario, Canada
- Profession: druggist, physician

John Urquhart Jr. (1844 – December 17, 1933) was a Canadian politician, druggist, and physician. He was the mayor of Oakville, Ontario, Canada from 1888 to 1891.

== Early life ==
Urquhart was born in Oakville, Canada West. His father was John Urquhart, a Scottish immigrant to Canada, by way of New York, who was a surgeon and apothecary. The family lived in a combined house a business called Medical Hall in Oakville, Canada West. This building still stands as 182 Lakeshore Road East.

At age sixteen, Urquhart ran away from home and worked as a sailor aboard Great Lakes ships. He subsequently worked as a farmer. Next, he studied at the Rolph School of Medicine in Toronto, the University of Trinity College, and the Royal College of Physicians of Edinburgh.

== Career ==
After his father's death, Urquhart took over the operation of Medical Hall.

Urquhart served as mayor of Oakville for two terms from 1888 to 1891.

== See also ==
- List of mayors of Oakville, Ontario
