= Stonehooking =

Methods of grabbing some slabs

Stonehooking was a method of gathering stone slabs from the shallow lake shore in Southern Ontario destined primarily for building construction. It flourished as an industry from the mid-nineteenth century to the early twentieth century until the use of concrete block supplanted it as a building material, after it was introduced in 1915.

Stonehooking was unique to the north shores of Lake Ontario, from Coburg to Burlington. Stonehooking fleets were found at ports in Frenchman's Bay, Port Credit, Oakville, and Bronte. During the heyday of the stonehooking industry, in the late 1800's, as many as thirty schooners operated out of Port Credit. In Toronto Harbour, an estimated 1,000,000 m^{3} (35,000,000 cu ft) was removed by the industry.

Specialized schooners known as stonehookers would anchor close to shore. A small skiff, yawl boat or scow would be sent out to gather the stone. This was accomplished using long rakes with hooks at the end to pry up slabs of stone which would be piled on the smaller vessel. The stone would then be loaded on the schooner's deck until full, before crews set sail for a market destination to unload. Toronto was the largest market for stonehookers, with most stone loads destined for Toronto Harbour and the Queen's City Wharf.
