= Ras Lanuf Refinery =

Building in Libya

- Location of in Libya
- Location: Ras Lanuf, Libya; 30°28′29″N 18°34′25″E

Refinery details
- Operator: Libyan Emirates Oil Refining Company
- Opened: 1984
- Capacity: 220,000 barrels per day (35,000 m^{3}/d)

The Ras Lanuf Refinery is a topping and reforming oil refinery in Ras Lanuf, Libya. It is part of a larger petrochemical complex also consisting of an ethylene plant, a polyethylene plant, plant utilities, and Ra's Lanuf Harbor. Until 9 March 2009, the complex was operated by the RASCO, a subsidiary of the National Oil Corporation. The current operator is the Libyan Emirates Oil Refining Company.

== History ==
The Ra's Lanuf Refinery became operational during 1984. In 2007, the decision to expand the refinery for the production of benzene, butadiene, and MTBE was made. For this, NOC concluded a contract to establish a joint venture with Dow Chemical Company. In 2008, a $2 billion contract with the Star Consortium, comprising the Al Ghurair's subsidiary TransAsia Gas International and ETA Ascon Star Group's Star Petro Energy, to own and upgrade the refinery was concluded. However, in March 2009, NOC and Al Ghurair's subsidiary Trusta signed an agreement to form a joint venture the Libyan Emirati Refining Company (Lerco) to operate and upgrade the refinery.

Additional storage tanks were to be built by Vitol, with the expansion expected to be completed by 2013.

== Description ==
The refinery has a capacity of 220,000 barrels per day (35,000 m^{3}/d). It is a simple hydroskimming refinery, but its products meet market specifications due to the use of high quality crude oil. It produces fuel oil, gas oil, naphtha and kerosene. The complex also produces petrochemicals, utilizing naphtha as a feed stock for an ethylene plant with a capacity of 1.2 million tons per year (tpy). Its main products are ethylene (330,000 tpy), propylene (170,000 tpy), Mix C4 (130,000 tpy) and P Gasoline (335,000 tpy).
