= William Romain =

William Romain may refer to:

- William Romain (archaeologist) (William Francis Romain), American archaeologist, archaeoastronomer, and author
- William Francis Romain (politician), Canadian businessman and politician

== See also ==
- William Romaine, evangelical divine of the Church of England
