= Bronte, Ontario =

Bronte
- Unincorporated community
- Location within Regional Municipality of Halton Location within Southern Ontario
- Coordinates: 43°23′22″N 79°43′4″W
- Country: Canada
- Province: Ontario
- Regional municipality: Halton
- Town: Oakville
- Founded: 1834
- Time zone: UTC-5 (EST)
  - Summer (DST): UTC-4 (EDT)
- Forward sortation area: L
- Area codes: 905 and 289
- NTS Map: 030M05
- GNBC Code: FALWE

Bronte (BRON-tee) is the community that makes up much of the west end of Oakville, in Ontario, Canada. Twelve Mile Creek (known informally as Bronte Creek) flows through the middle of town and empties into Lake Ontario. Main roads include Bronte Road (north-south), Lakeshore Road West (east-west, parallel to Lake Ontario) and Rebecca Street (east-west). Streets in the business section include Lakeshore, Jones, Marine, and Ontario Street. Bronte is also accessed via a superhighway (the Queen Elizabeth Way) located to the north of the former village. Other main roads include Third Line, Speers Road and Burloak Drive to the west (the latter was named after the boundary of Burlington and Oakville).

Bronte is a former fishing village which became annexed in 1962 with the former Township of Trafalgar, forming the Town of Oakville, along with the other formerly autonomous communities, including Sheridan.

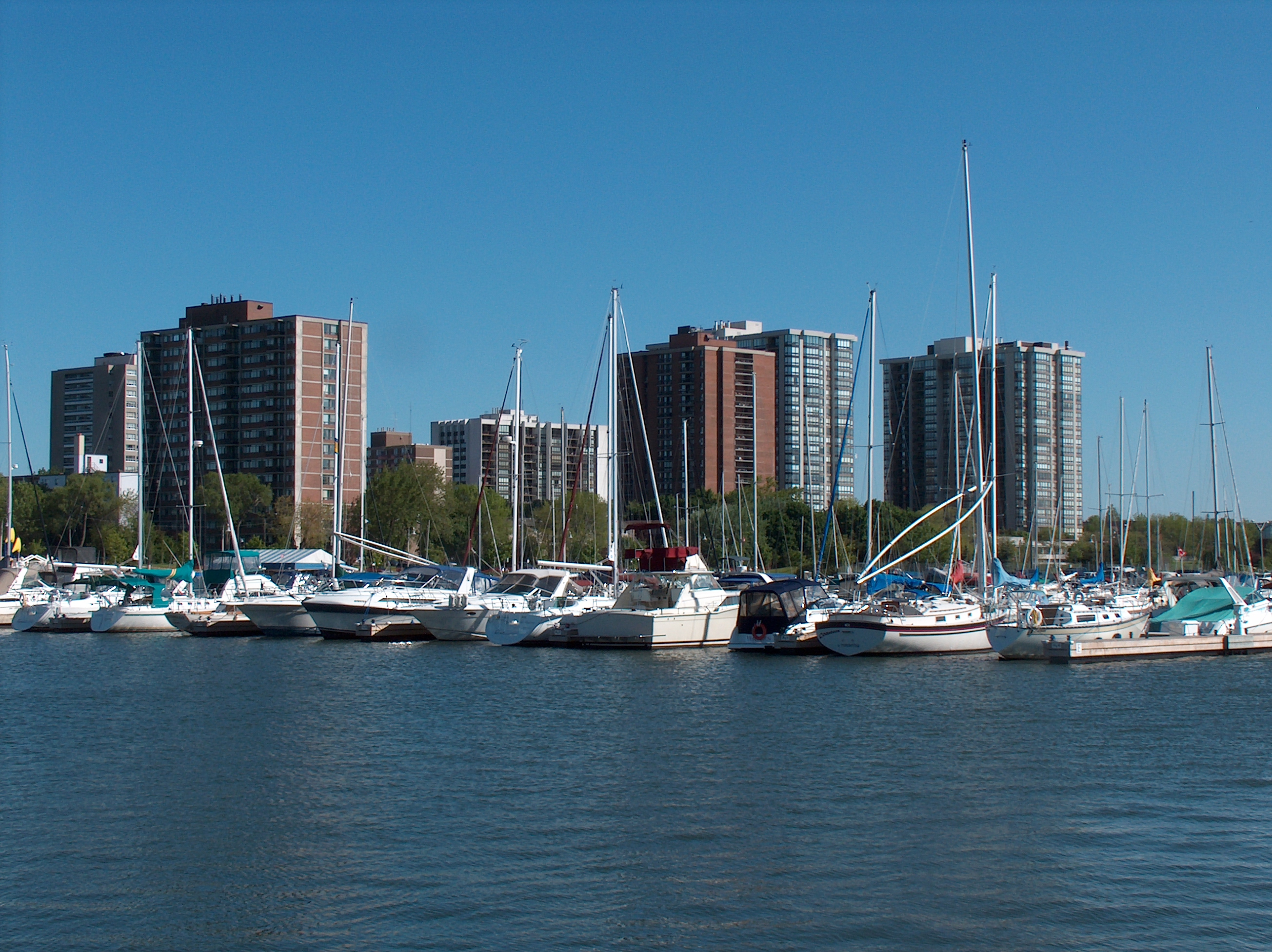
The Bronte Marina. In the background the high rise apartment buildings of the Bronte community can be seen

== Description ==
The urban area of Bronte is in its north, east and southwest. The north-central part is industrialized while the west is mixed with some farmland, a former Petro-Canada refinery (which has closed and has yet to be dismantled as of 2010) and forests cover the northwest and includes Bronte Creek Provincial Park which cuts off Upper Middle Road. The park area is also used for trailers and tents. Farmland used to cover most of Bronte (except for the northwest) before suburban housing came in the 1960s and the 1970s. Lakeshore houses are situated along the shore of Lake Ontario. The narrow ravine of Bronte Creek is undeveloped, except at the mouth which serves as a harbour.

== Culture and neighbourhood ==
Bronte's neighbourhood stretches from Burloak Drive in the west to Third Line, and from Lake Ontario in the south to Rebecca Street. Coronation Park, in the adjacent neighbourhood of Southwest Oakville, has a large playground, plentiful parking space, a field room, and sandy beaches. It hosts the annual Waterfront Festival. Its greatest attraction is an outdoor stage fronting an area 256 feet deep and 152 feet wide, with a hillock at the side. During the Waterfront Festival, the east field has carnival rides such as 1001 Niches and Polar Express, and features game kiosks. The parking lot is turned into a string of kiosks offering food and product information. The stage has extra lighting installed with a projector screen, an autograph booth at the side, and a DJ booth in the middle.

Rail and bus service operates from Bronte GO Station, situated on the Lakeshore West line connecting Bronte to communities along the shore, including Toronto. Originally known as Oakville West, the station became known by its current name when it was rebuilt. The station boasts having more than 1,700 parking spaces and is located off Wyecroft Road with access from the South Service Road.

Bronte has a number of schools, including Gladys Speers, Eastview and Brookdale (Public Elementary), St. Dominic and St. Nicholas (Catholic Elementary), and Oakville Christian School, formerly John Wilson (Public Elementary). Thomas A. Blakelock (Public Secondary School), St. Thomas Aquinas (Catholic Secondary School) rounds out the list.

Although the commercial centre is at Bronte Road and Lakeshore, the South Oakville Centre, (Hopedale Mall) located at Rebecca Street and Third Line Road provides additional retail businesses. Originally an L-shaped strip mall built in 1959 coincident with the development of the surrounding subdivision, it has undergone several expansions by which it has been enclosed with the closing of Seabourne Street between Tansley Drive and Rebecca Street.

== History ==
Founded in 1834, Bronte began as a small fishing village at the mouth of Twelve Mile Creek. The name Bronte was chosen as a tribute to the British Naval hero, Horatio Nelson, who was made Duke of Bronte by King Ferdinand III of Sicily. Bronte's etymological root is the Greek word βροντή which means thunder.

Some of Bronte's original settlers were United Empire Loyalists and many of the streets were named for these founding fathers: Sovereign, Hixon, Nelson and Belyea.

One of the early industries in Bronte was stonehooking. Boats would gather stone slabs from shallow waters near the shore by hooking them from Lake Ontario for use in construction. The building at 49 Bronte Road built circa 1840 still remains as an example of construction using material stonehooked from the lake.

Its post office dates from 1851. Bronte's first harbour was completed in 1856.

In the 1920s, Middle Road was built with 3 interchanges including Service Road. Middle Road became part of the Queen Elizabeth Way (QEW) in 1939.

In the mid-20th century, Cities Service built a refinery just south of the QEW, west of Bronte Road. The refinery was later acquired by BP and subsequently, Petro-Canada. Another refinery to the west was built by Shell with its entrance off Rebecca Street. The Shell Refinery ceased operations in the 1980s. The Petro-Canada refinery was decommissioned in 2009 and now is a bulk storage facility.

Streets in Bronte are numbered from east to west and lettered from A to L (or N?) from north to south. A housing boom started in the late 1950s south of the QEW. Starting in the late-1980s, housing developments began north of the QEW and westward towards Burlington.

In the 1960s, Highway 25 to Milton was redesignated from Guelph Line to Bronte Road. Later in the 1980s, an interchange for Burloak was added. This major arterial route is no longer an Ontario highway, but a regional road, called "The Veterans Highway."

In the 2000s, a new two-lane bridge was built to connect New Street at Mississaga Street and Rebecca Street at Bronte Road.

A community called Lakeshore Woods was built where the former Shell Research Centre was located. Construction began in the 2000s and is planned for completion by 2010.

In early March 2006, Stoneboats restaurant, which was partly located in one of Bronte's most historical buildings (built in circa 1840), suffered heavy fire damage and was rebuilt. A large portion of the historical part of the building was destroyed.

In April 2009, the Bronte Business Improvement Association and the owners of the Bronte Village Mall presented a proposal for revitalizing the mall which includes residential, office and retail space. The zoning was approved in 2012 following the resolution of a zoning dispute between the developer and the Town of Oakville at the Ontario Municipal Board. The mall was then redeveloped into 10- and 14-storey residential buildings with ground floor retail and a combined total of 480 luxury rental units, as well as a Rexall outlet.

The electoral district which Bronte is situated in is Oakville West, as of the 2025 Federal Election.
