= Oakville Refinery (Shell Canada) =

Coordinates: 43.3816°N 79.7220°W

Shell Oakville Refinery
- Interactive map of Shell Oakville Refinery
- Location: Oakville, Ontario, Canada

Refinery details
- Operator: Shell Canada
- Owner: Shell Canada
- Opened: 1953
- Closed: 1983
- Capacity: 44,000 barrels per day (7,000 m^{3}/d)
- Refining center: Toronto

Shell Oakville Refinery was an oil refinery located at Oakville, Ontario in Canada. It was located south of the Oakville Refinery. It had a processing capacity of 44,000 barrels per day (7,000 m^{3}/d).

The refinery was decommissioned in 1983. The site has been cleaned up and redeveloped as a residential area, with parkland.
