= Leokadiya Kashperova =

Russian pianist and composer (1872–1940)

Leokadiya Aleksandrovna Kashperova (Russian: Леокадия Александровна Кашперова; 16 May 1872 – 3 December 1940) was a Russian pianist and Romantic composer. She was the piano teacher of composer Igor Stravinsky.

== Life ==
=== Early life and education ===
Leokadiya Kashperova was born in Lyubim, near Yaroslavl in 1872. She graduated first in 1893 from the St Petersburg Conservatoire at the culmination of her studies in Anton Rubinstein’s piano class, and a second time, in 1895, after studying composition with Nicolai Soloviev, conducting her cantata Orvasi.

=== Professional musical life ===
Over the following years, she composed works which included a symphony, a piano concerto, choral works, chamber music, piano solos and art-songs. Her works received public recognition, for example, The Russian Musical Gazette noted in 1912: "Her gifts as a composer are a most welcome phenomenon of St Petersburg’s musical life". For some time, she hosted regular musical evenings at her apartment in St Petersburg on Tuesdays.

In 1907 she undertook concert tours, to Berlin and twice to London. The Times (London, 1907) observed that "Mlle Kashperova’s music shows a decided talent, very attractive in its tunefulness, grace and Russian fitfulness of mood".

=== Bolshevik revolution and later life ===
In 1916, Kashperova became a teacher at the Smolny Institute. There she met Sergei Andropov, who was her student and a Bolshevik leader, and they married in the same year.

However, when the February Revolution began, the Smolny Institute was used as the headquarters for the revolution, so to save themselves from being arrested the couple left Petrograd for Rostov-on-Don. From 1918 to 1920, she moved to Moscow (due to the Bolshevik success), but rarely performed until her final solo recital, an all-Beethoven programme, was given on 30 November 1920. (Note: According to expert Dr Graham Griffiths who had researched the life of Kashperova since 2002, there is "no evidence of Kashperova giving any concerts between 1916 and 1920".)

From then to her death, she composed in secret and became forgotten by the Soviet public. By the time she died she was mostly remembered by Stravinsky who called her "antiquated and a blockhead".

== Selected compositions ==
- 2 Sonatas for piano & cello Op 1 (in G, op 1 no 1, and in E minor, op 1 no 2)
- Evening & night chorus a cappella
- In the midst of nature (suite for piano solo)
- Trio Violin, Violoncello Piano a-Moll
- Sredi prirody ("Amidst Nature")
- Vecher i nochʹ ("Evening and Night ")
- Piano Concerto in A minor op. 2
- Songs of Love: 12 Romances soprano and piano
- Symphony in B minor op. 4 full orchestra
- The Eagle and the Snake: Ballad for low voice and piano

Her Piano Concerto in A minor and Symphony in B minor have been recorded by Oliver Triendl (piano) and the Rundfunk-Sinfonieorchester Berlin, conducted by Anna Skryleva.

== Legacy ==
In January 1910 Kashperova recorded seven piano rolls for the reproducing piano Welte-Mignon, six pieces by Mily Balakirev and one with own piano pieces.

In 2002, while doing his Doctor of Philosophy at Oxford, Graham Griffiths found Kaspherova's name while researching Stravinsky. Soon, she became his main focus of research. He gave an interview to the BBC about Kashperova of which, after a lengthy period of neglect of Kashperova's music, during International Women’s Day 2018, BBC Radio 3 broadcast the final movement of Kashperova's Symphony in B minor (1905). (Note: This broadcast was performed by Jane Glover and the BBC Concert Orchestra who gave the symphony a full performance during a concert) Leokadiya Kashperova was featured as BBC Radio 3's Composer of the Week for the week commencing 12 December 2022.

Kashperova's symphony was subsequently published by Boosey & Hawkes. To commemorate the 150th anniversary of her birth day, Boosey & Hawkes released five short video documentaries regarding Graham Griffith's research into and revival of her music. With renewed interest in Kashperova's works, more orchestras have performed her Symphony in B minor, such as:

- BBC Concert Orchestra (UK Premiere), conducted by Jane Glover in March 2018
- Theater Magdeburg (German Premiere), conducted by Anna Skryleva in September 2019
- Philharmonisches Orchester Bremerhaven, conducted by Marc Niemann in October 2021
- New York Repertory Orchestra (USA Premiere), conducted by David Leibowitz in April 2022
- Orchestra of the City, conducted by Chris Hopkins in February 2024
- Oakville Symphony Orchestra (Canadian Premiere), conducted by Lorenzo Guggenheim in April 2024
- Hochschulsymphonieorchester München, conducted by Marcus Bosch in April 2024
- São Paulo Municipal Symphony Orchestra (Brazilian Premiere), conducted by Roberto Minczuk in May/June 2024
- Winnipeg Symphony Orchestra, conducted by Daniel Raiskin in November 2024
- Detroit Symphony Orchestra , conducted by Jader Bignamini in June 2025

== See also ==
- List of women composers by birth date
- Vladimir Kashperov (uncle of Leokadiya Kashperova)
