= Hedley Shaw =

Canadian mayor (1866–1921)

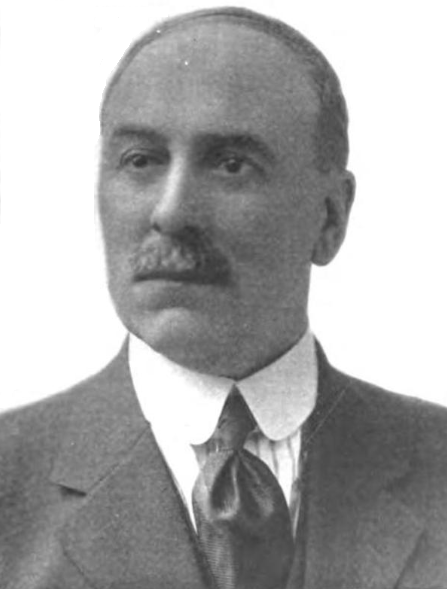

Mayor of Oakville, Ontario
- In office 1900

Personal details
- Born: July 29, 1866; Glanford township, Canada West
- Died: November 29, 1921 (aged 55); Toronto, Ontario
- Spouse: Annettie Mitchell (m. 1889)
- Children: 4
- Occupation: Miller, politician, Businessman

Hedley Shaw (July 29, 1866 – November 29, 1921) was a miller and politician in Ontario. He served as mayor of Oakville in 1900.

== Biography ==
He was born in Glanford township, the son of Thomas Shaw, a farmer. Shaw was educated in the County of Brant and apprenticed as a miller in Brantford. He established himself in business and operated in Brantford until 1893, when he purchased mills at Oakville, partnering in business with Thomas Foulds. In 1898, he bought out his partner and became president of the Hedley Shaw Milling Company. Shaw purchased mills at St. Catharines, Thorold and Port Colborne. In 1910, the Maple Leaf Milling Company, later part of Maple Leaf Foods, was formed and Shaw became vice-president and managing director. Shaw was also president of the Hedley Shaw Milling Company of Medicine Hat, vice-president of the St. Mary's Cement Company and president of the Port Colborne & St. Lawrence Navigation Company.

On April 4, 1889, he married Annetta Mitchell. Shaw died in Toronto.
