= Martin MacDonald =

Canadian conductor (born 1977)

- Born: ca 1977; Cape Breton, Nova Scotia, Canada
- Education: McGill University; Memorial University of Newfoundland
- Occupation: conductor

Martin MacDonald (born ca 1977) is a Canadian conductor and the music director of the Cathedral Bluffs Symphony Orchestra since January 2022.

== Early life ==
He was born on Cape Breton Island, Nova Scotia, MacDonald is the youngest of 12 children, and started to play cello when he was six years old. He participated in the family's Celtic music band. He studied cello at Memorial University of Newfoundland and earned a master's degree in conducting at McGill University.

== Career ==
When he graduated he was hired at National Academy Orchestra of Canada and in 2008 he took a job as Associate Conductor for Symphony Nova Scotia.

He has guest conducted for the Hamilton Philharmonic Orchestra, Thunder Bay Symphony Orchestra, Orchestra London Canada, Windsor Symphony Orchestra, National Arts Centre Orchestra, and the Oakville Symphony Orchestra.

== Awards ==
In 2010, MacDonald was awarded the Jean-Marie Beaudet Award in Orchestral Conducting awarded by the Canada Council for the Arts and in 2013 he won the Heinz Unger Award awarded by the Ontario Arts Council.
