= T. A. Blakelock High School =

Thomas A. Blakelock High School

Location
- 1160 Rebecca Street; Oakville, Ontario, L6L 1Y9; Canada

Information
- School type: High School
- Motto: Ad majora natus sum (Latin: I was born for greater things)
- Founded: 1957
- School board: Halton District School Board
- Superintendent: Eleanor McIntosh
- Area trustee: Carole Baxter
- School number: 947539
- Principal: John Stieva
- Grades: 9–12
- Enrolment: 1,204 (2025-2026)
- Language: English, French Immersion
- Colours: Green, Black, and White
- Mascot: Tabbie
- Team name: Tigers
- Feeder schools: Brookdale, Eastview, Oakwood, Ecole Pine Grove and WH Morden public schools
- Website: tab.hdsb.ca

T. A. Blakelock High School is the second oldest high school in the town of Oakville, Ontario, and has the oldest high school building in Oakville still in use as a school. The school was built in 1957. There are 1,200 students currently enrolled at T.A. Blakelock. The school is named after Thomas Aston Blakelock.

The school's athletic teams were originally known as the Tabbies, after the acronym TAB. They are now called the Tigers. Name was changed after Sean Tiger, the science teacher at T.A. Blackelock who also was one of the founders of the Oakville Centre for the Performing Arts.

Blakelock is the only public high school in southwest Oakville, after the closure of Queen Elizabeth High School and the transfer of Gordon E. Perdue High School to the Catholic Board in 1990.

The current principal is John Stieva.

Blakelock is known for having an excellent music program. In 2013, its Senior Wind Ensemble and Grade 12 Percussion Ensemble both won Gold at MusicFest's Canadian National Music Festival.

== Notable alumni ==
- Dan Ferrone - CFL player, president of CFLPA, Canadian Football Hall of Fame inductee (2013)
- David Bradstreet - musician
- Arlene Duncan - (1974) actress, singer; played Fatima in Little Mosque on the Prairie
- Lindy Booth - (1997) actress
- Greg Westlake - (2004) ice sledge hockey player

== See also ==
- Education in Ontario
- List of secondary schools in Ontario
