= Vladimir Kashperov =

Russian composer, theorist, and professor

Vladimir Nikitich Kashperov (Russian: Владимир Никитич Кашперов, 25 August 1826 – 26 June 1894) was an Imperial Russian composer, theorist and professor.

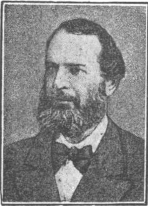
Picture of Vladimir N. Kashperov (1894)

Kashperov was born on 25 August 1826 in Chufarovo within the Simbirsk (now Ulyanovsk) province in the Russian empire. He died on 26 June 1894 in the village of Romantsevo, located in the Mozhaysky district, Moscow.

== Family ==
Kashperov was married to Adel Nikolaevna Kashperova (maidan name: Beketova), a soprano operatic singer. Glinka's book "The School of Singing" is dedicated to her. He had one daughter named E. V. Kashperova.

== Life ==
In 1844, he graduated from the School of Guards Ensigns in St. Petersburg, and served in the Life Guards Cuirassier Regiment. Upon leaving military service, he began to devote himself to music. He studied piano with German composers Adolf von Henselt and Hans Vogt. Having been recommended by Mikhail Glinka, in the 1850s he began to take lessons in composition from German musicologist and composer Sieghfried W. Dehn in Berlin. Kashperov then travelled to Italy and lived there for eight years (1857-1865), whereupon he learned the basics of Italian vocal singing. In 1865, he returned to Moscow upon an invitation from Anton Rubenstein to teach at the Moscow Conservatory (1866-1872). He later opened a private singing studio, and from 1890 to 1894 became a singing teacher for locally organized (zemstvo) schools within the Moscow district. Some of his students included Konstantin Alelekov, Pavel Bogatirev, and Aleksandr Gorotsov.

Kashperov was close with the atmosphere of both Russian and European intelligentic culture at the time including Russian political philosophers and poets like Alexander Herzen and Nikolay Ogarev, Italian general Giuseppe Garibaldi, as well as Russian composers, writers, and playwrights like Mikhail Glinka, Alexander Dargomyzhsky, Ivan Turgenev, and Alexander Odoevsky.

== Career ==
Vladimir Kashperov wrote numerous operas, as well as Russian romances, and was critically engaged with public music education, personally founding a choral society in Moscow as well as operating his own music school. In 1874 he became a member of the "Society of Dramatic Writers and Opera Composers." He was also involved in the tradition of Orthodox church singing, founded "Society of Lovers of Church Singing," and wrote a number of articles on the subject, contained in Ivan S. Aksaskov's 1881 compendium, "Rus." He also helped Italian operatic bass Luigi Lablash get his book, "The School of Singing," published in Russia in the late 1860s.

Kashperov's opera "Mary Tudor," based on the life of the Queen of France, was first performed in Milan for the Empress Alexandra Feodorovna (then wife of Nicholas I).

According to Richard Taruskin, Kashperov was one of the "Russian Italianists" due to his extensive training in Italy and compositional style. Favorited by Alexander Ostrovsky and one of Glinka's star pupils, his eight years in Italy contributed to his Italianate musical language. While in Italy, Kashperov had three of his operas produced: Maria Tudor (Milan, 1859); Rienzi (Florence, 1863); Consuelo (Venice, 1865). These operas, while no longer performed, were among the first performed Russian operas in Italy since the 18th century. Kashperov's opera "The Storm" (867), due to extensive critique by critics like Alexander Serov for its lack of sophistication, never entered the Mariinsky Theatre canon.

== Compositions ==
=== Operas ===
- 1859: Mary Tudor
- 1863: Rienzi (self-translation of Wagner's opera)
- 1865: Consuelo
- 1867: The Storm (Гроза)

== See also ==
- Leokadiya Kashperova
