= Robert Land (1739–1818) =

British spy and settler

Robert Land (1739–1818) was a United Empire Loyalist and British spy during the American Revolution, and one of the first British settlers of Hamilton, Ontario, Canada.

== Early life ==
Born in Tiverton in Devonshire, England, Land emigrated as a young man to the British Thirteen Colonies in America. He settled near Calkins Creek at what is now Milanville, Pennsylvania and started a farm. In 1756, he married Phoebe Scott. By 1776, Land had been appointed Justice of the Peace.

== Work during American Revolutionary War ==
During the American Revolution, Land carried out many espionage missions for the British Army. He was eventually captured by American revolutionaries, tried and convicted as a traitor. His conviction was overturned by George Washington on the grounds that as a citizen of Pennsylvania, he could not be tried in a military court. He was released on bail while awaiting a new trial. Upon Land's release, he was wounded and chased by a gang of vigilantes whilst travelling to Niagara with a group of Loyalists, but managed to escape.

== Settlement of Hamilton, Ontario ==
Returning to his Pennsylvania home, Land found that it had been destroyed. Believing that his wife and children were dead, Land decided to leave the colonies. He traveled through New York State to the Niagara River, which he crossed to what was then the British Province of Quebec, but was later to be Upper Canada, and then Ontario.

Once in Canada, Land received a land grant of 312 acres, which now forms part of Hamilton. Several years later, Land was reunited with his family. Phoebe and her children had traveled for sanctuary to New York City, which was still under British occupation. At the end of the war, they and other Loyalists were evacuated by the Royal Navy to the British Colony of New Brunswick. Seven years after arriving in New Brunswick, Phoebe heard a rumor about a man named Land who lived near Lake Ontario. Two years later, Phoebe and her children traveled to what was by then Upper Canada to reunite with Land.

== Later life ==
When Land died in July 1818 aged 79, Hamilton was developing into a village. Phoebe died in 1826 aged 93.

Phoebe's youngest brother's son was the American general Winfield Scott who led a military incursion into Upper Canada in the War of 1812. Robert and Phoebe's son, Colonel Robert Land (1772–1867), served in the Battle of Queenston Heights and the Battle of Stoney Creek in Upper Canada.

== Family Relationships ==
Robert and Phoebe Land are the third great-grandparents of Charles Lindbergh.
