= Robert Kerr Chisholm =

Robert Kerr Chisholm (May 26, 1819 – February 27, 1899) was a political figure in Oakville, Ontario, serving as mayor in 1866.

Robert was born in Nelson Township in Upper Canada in 1819, the third son of William Chisholm, and was educated in Hamilton. Chisholm served as reeve of Trafalgar Township in 1854 and 1856 and served on the Oakville town council from 1857 to 1871 and 1879 to 1880. After his father died, Robert, aged 19, took on the responsibility of Collector of Customs and Postmaster at the port of Oakville. He served this position for 55 years.

In 1899, Robert died in Oakville at the age of 79 and was buried at St. Mary's Pioneer Cemetery.

His brother George King Chisholm served in the Legislative Assembly of the province and was the first mayor of Oakville.

== See also ==
- William Chisholm
- George King Chisholm
- List of mayors of Oakville, Ontario
