= Kauyumari =

Orchestral work by Gabriela Ortiz

Kauyumari is an orchestral composition written in 2021 by the Mexican composer Gabriela Ortiz. The work was commissioned by the Los Angeles Philharmonic, which first performed the piece under the conductor Gustavo Dudamel at the Walt Disney Concert Hall on October 9, 2021.

== Composition ==
Kauyumari is written in a single movement and lasts about 7 minutes. The title means "blue deer" in the Huichol language and refers to a spiritual guide in Huichol folklore that is encountered during a pilgrimage on the hallucinogenic cactus peyote. In the score program note, Ortiz wrote, "Each year, these Native Mexicans embark on a symbolic journey to 'hunt' the blue deer, making offerings in gratitude for having been granted access to the invisible world, through which they also are able to heal the wounds of the soul." The music thus quotes a traditional Huichol melody, which the composer had previously used in the final movement of her 1997 string quartet Altar de Muertos (Altar of the Dead).

=== Instrumentation ===
The work is scored for a large orchestra comprising piccolo, two flutes, two oboes, cor anglais, two clarinets, bass clarinet, two bassoons, contrabassoon, four horns, four trumpets, two trombones, bass trombone, tuba, timpani, four percussionists, harp, and strings. Percussion consists of seed pod rattle, claves, jawbone, tambourine, metal güiro, sistrum, tam-tam, suspended cymbal, xylophone, glockenspiel, bass drum, snare drum, shaker, log drum, and bongos.

== Reception ==
Reviewing the world premiere, Mark Swed of the Los Angeles Times praised the piece as "magical" and wrote, "With her kaleidoscopic eyes (and ears), this Gaby in the sky with diamonds turned the jaunty tune into a ravishing vision, its repetitious rhythms keeping a listener glued while the changing instrumental colors created the unnerving effect of feeling unglued. The Huichol melody was always there, but you never could predict where or how it would turn up in the orchestra. We thought we knew what was happening, but Ortiz kept reminding us that we didn't, which felt exactly of our own moment. I suspect (and hope) Kauyumari will join the orchestral hit parade." Jim Farber of the San Francisco Classical Voice similarly described the performance as "quite special," remarking, "Imbued with the musical flavors of her native Mexico, Kauyumari depicts a journey, over the course of a brief six minutes, from the shadowy rumblings of a bass drum and gong, to shafts of radiant light peeling forth in the brass, much the same way they do in Aaron Copland's Fanfare for the Common Man. Ultimately, the spirit of a Mexican folk dance makes its entrance as a solo piccolo, then grows into a rhythmically interweaving, pulsating explosion of hope and renewal."

Oussama Zahr of The New York Times lauded Kauyumari as "a churning engine of sound." However, David Wright of the New York Classical Review was more critical of the piece, describing it "elusive" and opining, "It opened promisingly with distant thunder in the timpani, a drip of percussion rain, and a 'sunrise' for brass and winds, then settled into a phrase repeated over and over with changing orchestration, in what might be called a bit of Meximalism." He added, "this deer proved as hard to discern in Ortiz's circling score as the 'enigma' in Elgar's variations."
