= William Chisholm (Upper Canada politician) =

Politician in Upper Canada (1788-1842)

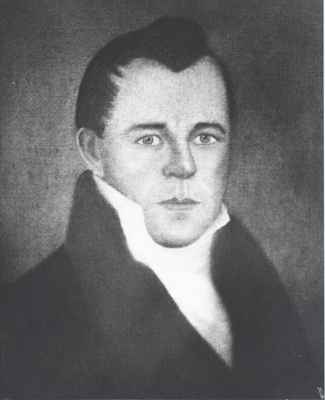
Painting of Colonel William Chisholm

William Chisholm (October 15, 1788 – May 4, 1842) was a farmer, businessman and political figure in Upper Canada.

Chisholm was born in Jordan Bay, Nova Scotia, in 1788, the son of a Scottish immigrant and United Empire Loyalist who originally settled in Tryon County, New York. By 1793, the family moved to Upper Canada and settled near Burlington Bay, the current site of the city of Hamilton.

In 1811, he was commissioned as an ensign in the 2nd York Militia. While serving under Captain Samuel Hatt of the 5th Lincoln Militia at the occupation of Detroit during the War of 1812, Chisholm was chosen to replace the American flag with the Union Jack at Fort Detroit, in which he was later awarded the General Service Medal.

In 1820, Chisholm was elected to the Legislative Assembly of Upper Canada for Halton. He was originally a Reformer and opposed the expulsion of Barnabas Bidwell from the assembly. He had supported Robert Gourlay, and he acted as an agent for William Lyon Mackenzie's newspaper, the Colonial Advocate. He had opened a general store and later also ran an inn; he was also a lumber merchant. In 1825, he was named postmaster for Nelson Township. By 1826, he had a change of heart politically, and by 1837, he helped put down the revolt at Montgomery's Tavern during the Upper Canada Rebellion.

In 1827, Chisolm convinced Lieutenant Governor Peregrine Maitland to auction off 960 acres of land at the mouth of Sixteen Mile Creek, a reserve held for the Mississaugas. He won the auction for a cost of £1,029 ($257,609 CAD in 2025), and within a year, laid out the town of Oakville and developed a shipyard and harbor to handle trade between Toronto, Hamilton and various American cities. Chisholm succeeded in acquiring the rights to the harbor for 50 years.

Chisholm opened the town's first tavern in 1828, sawmill in 1830, and gristmill in 1833. He was appointed customs collector in 1834 and postmaster in 1835. Chisholm was appointed justice of the peace in the Gore District, and was reelected in Halton in 1830 and 1836. In the mid-1830s, Chisholm and business partners, including John Forsyth and John Richardson of Forsyth, Richardson & Co., incorporated the Oakville Hydraulic Company to develop water power from Sixteen Mile Creek. Due to the projects impracticality due to the creeks depth, the banks foreclosed and creditors sued him. Chisolm, at the age of fifty-four, died two days after selling his properties to settle his debts. He was buried at Saint Mary's Cemetery in Oakville.

His sons continued to be prominent in the town of Oakville:

- George King Chisholm became the town's first mayor in 1857.
- Robert Kerr Chisholm later served as postmaster and customs collector at Oakville, and also served a term as mayor in 1866.
