= Oakville Centre for the Performing Arts =

- Oakville Centre, OC4PA

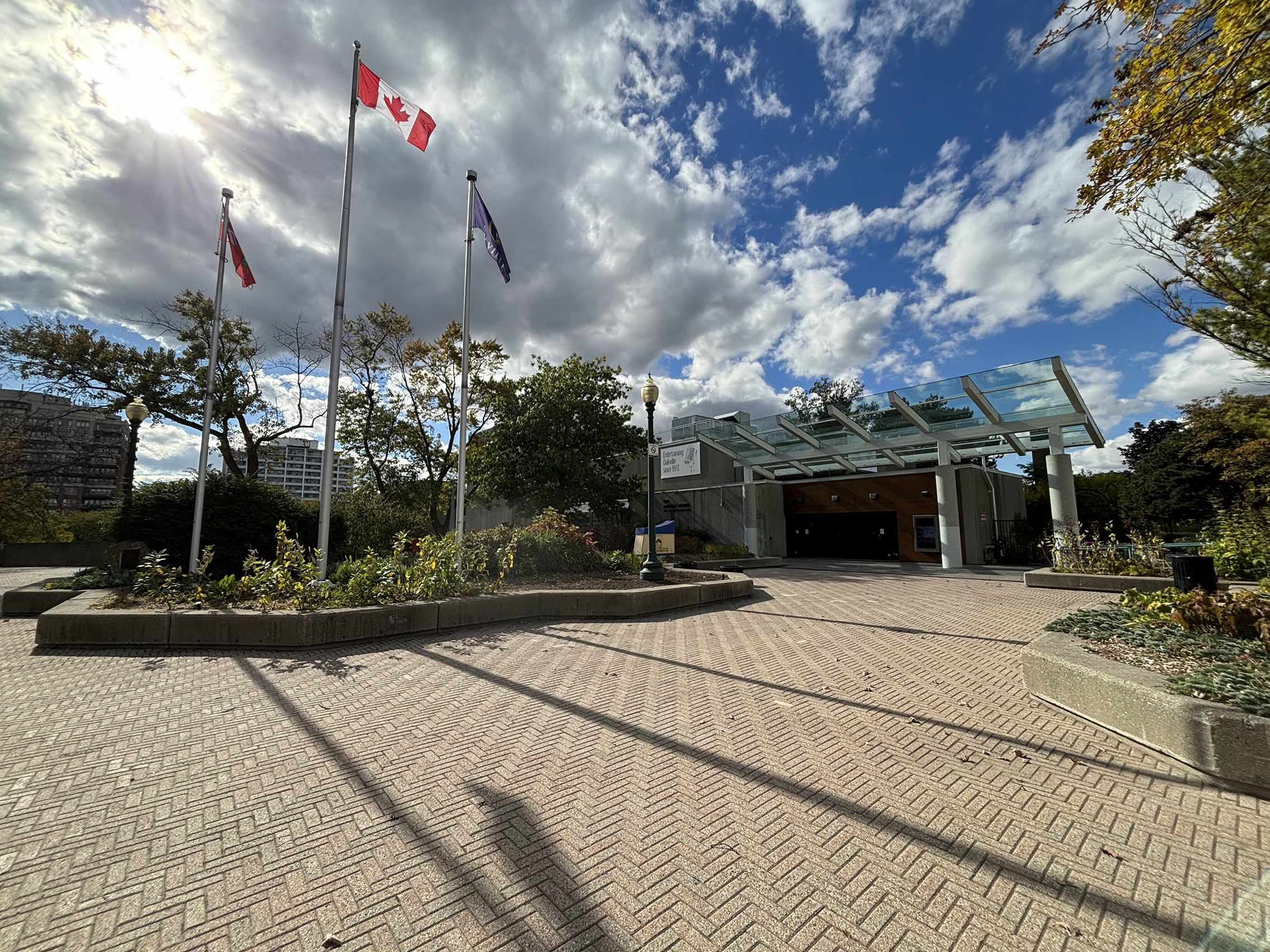
- Interactive map of Oakville Centre for the Performing Arts
- Location: 130 Navy Street, Oakville, Ontario
- Coordinates: 43°26′40″N 79°40′16″W
- Owner: Town of Oakville
- Seating type: Reserved seating
- Capacity: Auditorium - 470; Studio - 120
- Type: Performing arts centre

Construction
- Opened: 1977

Website
- www.oakvillecentre.ca

The Oakville Centre for the Performing Arts is a municipally run multi-use facility which opened in downtown Oakville, Ontario, Canada in 1977. The Oakville Centre was built to provide Oakville residents with a place to learn about themselves and the world around them through dance, music, storytelling and theatre. One of the founders of The Oakville Center was Sean Tiger, a former teacher at Thomas A. Blackelock High School.

The Oakville Centre contains two theatres, a 470-seat auditorium and a 120-seat intimate studio theatre. The Oakville Centre presents up to 260 performances a year which includes local, Canadian and international artists from around the world.

The Oakville Centre is home to several local-oriented performing arts groups:

- Oakville Ballet Company
- Oakville Drama Series
- Oakville Symphony Orchestra
- Oakville Wind Orchestra

Past professional performances have included:

- The Arrogant Worms
- Barenaked Ladies
- Blind Boys of Alabama
- Bill Cosby
- Arlo Guthrie
- Rita MacNeil
- Anne Murray
- Bob Newhart
- Don Rickles
- Lily Tomlin
- Tower of Power
- Roch Voisine
