= Kiwanis Music Festival =

Music competition series in Canada

The Kiwanis Music Festival movement consists of regional music competitions. These festivals are named after the Kiwanis service clubs which generally support the events in each community. Typically, musicians and speech arts performers at each festival are given the opportunity to perform and compete for scholarships.

== Festivals by city ==
City	Founded	Notes
Brantford, Ontario	1946	Brantford Kiwanis ended this music festival in 2017. Brant Music Festival continues as a new festival in the same tradition from 2018. Brantford Kiwanis Music Festival was originally Brantford Music Festival.
Barrie, Ontario	1979	Originally the Barrie Music Scholarship Competitions, the local Kiwanis chapter assumed operations in 1987.
Calgary, Alberta	1917	Kiwanis became actively involved in 1954, and was formally named the Kiwanis Music Festival in 1968.
Cape Breton Regional Municipality, Nova Scotia	1939	Originally organized as solely a music festival by local IODEs, in 1940 it added "elocution" and is now known as the Cape Breton Kiwanis Festival of Music, Speech and Drama. The Kiwanis Club of Sydney became the sponsor in 1960 and continues to support the annual Festival today.
Chatham, Ontario	1945	The Kiwanis Club of Chatham had their first festival in 1945. Currently the Kiwanis Club of Chatham-Kent is organizing this annual festival.
Edmonton, Alberta	1908	
Guelph, Ontario	1981	
Halifax, Nova Scotia	1935	Originally entitled Halifax Music Festival.
Hamilton, Ontario	1951	Defunct. Succeeded by the Hamilton Music Festival.
Kelowna, British Columbia	1926	Originally the Okanagan Valley Music Festival, which was hosted in a 3-year cycle among Kelowna, Penticton and Vernon. Kelowna's festival became fully autonomous in 1981.
Kingston, Ontario	1973	
Kitchener-Waterloo, Ontario	1948	
Lethbridge, Alberta	1931? (2008 marks the 78th festival)	Originally the Lethbridge Music Festival, the Kiwanis Club has operated the festival since 1953.
London, Ontario	1959	First year a small, limited competition. 2008 is indicated as 40th anniversary, where 1960 was the first of regular annual competitions.
Niagara Falls, Ontario	1949	Last event permanently cancelled 2020 due to COVID-19.
Ottawa, Ontario	1945	Originally Ottawa Music Festival Association until 1985 when Kiwanis became actively involved.
Penticton, British Columbia	1926	Originally the Okanagan Valley Music Festival, which was hosted in a 3-year cycle among Kelowna, Penticton and Vernon.
Peterborough, Ontario	1946	
Prince Edward Island	1946	Four local festivals (Kings County, Queens County, West Prince and East Prince) lead to provincial finals, then to the national finals.
St. John's, Newfoundland and Labrador	1952	
Toronto, Ontario	unknown	
Vancouver, British Columbia	1923	Originally the Earth Music Festival, established by the fraternal order of the Knights of Pythias. There are several smaller festival events from February each year (Jazz, Concert Band, Choral) leading up to the Main Festival in April.

== Festival participants ==
- Lara St. John, a London, Ontario-based Kiwanis Festival Winner.
