= Oakville Refinery (Petro-Canada) =

Oil refinery in Ontario, Canada

Coordinates: 43.3949°N 79.7346°W

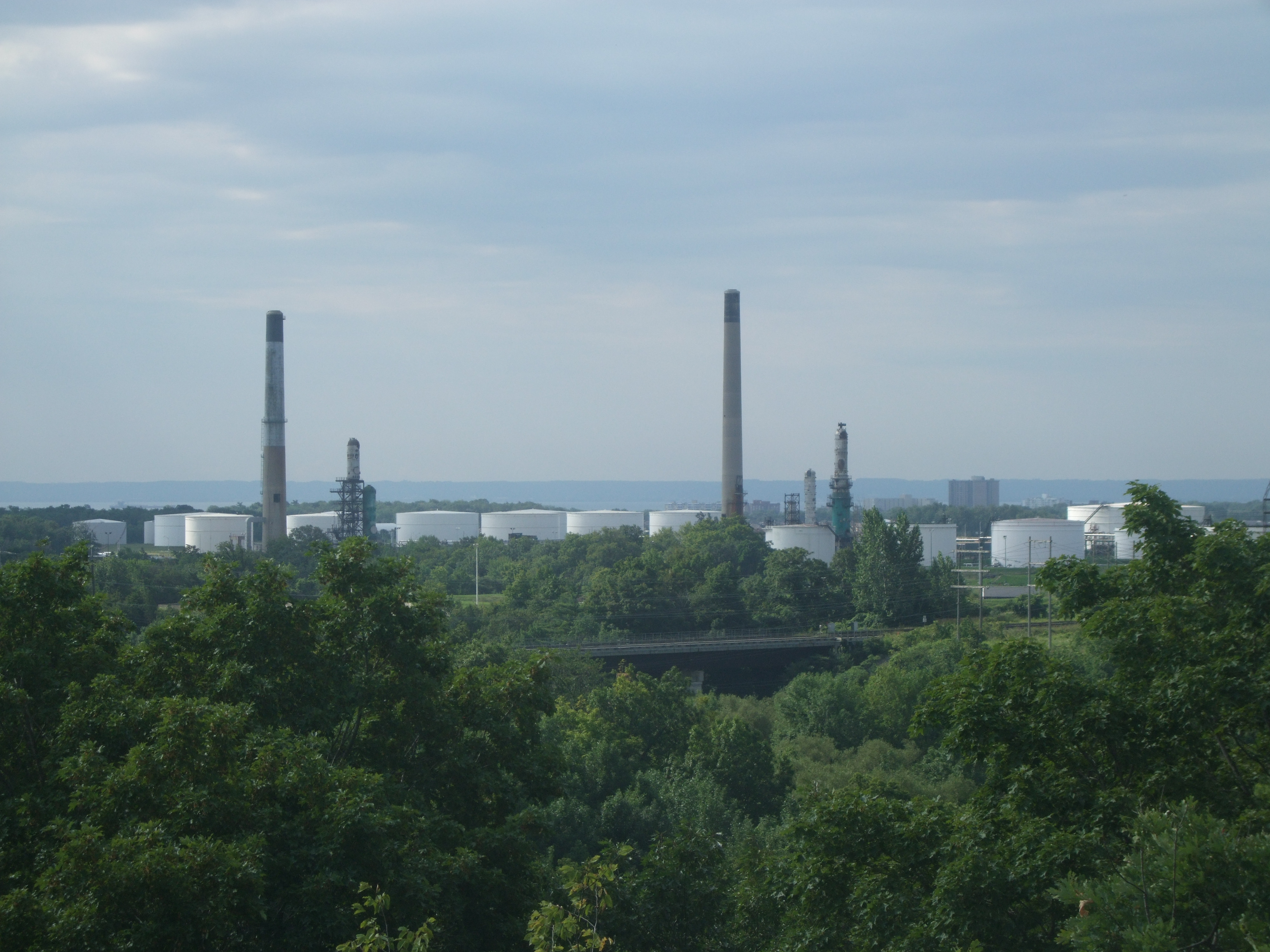
- Petro Canada Oakville Refinery
- Interactive map of Oakville Refinery
- Location: Oakville, Ontario, Canada

Refinery details
- Operator: Petro-Canada
- Owner: Petro-Canada
- Opened: 1958
- Closed: 2005
- Capacity: 90,000 barrels per day (14,000 m^{3}/d)
- No. of employees: 350
- No. of oil tanks: 29
- Refining center: Toronto

The Oakville Refinery (also known as Petro Canada Oakville Refinery) was a refinery located on the border of Oakville and Burlington in Ontario, Canada.

The refinery was commissioned in 1958 by Cities Service Company. It had an initial capacity 25,000 barrels per day (4,000 m^{3}/d). In 1963, the refinery was acquired by BP. Later it was acquired by Petro-Canada and supplied fuel in Ontario. It closed in 2005, with Petro-Canada (now Suncor Energy) getting supplies for the Ontario market from its Montreal Refinery.

The facility once employed 350 people and produced some 90,000 barrels per day (14,000 m^{3}/d). Petro-Canada ascribed the decision to close the facility to new rules requiring lower sulphur content in gasoline, that would have required an expensive retrofit of the refinery. The relatively small and specialized refinery was also less efficient than the larger ones operated elsewhere. The equipment from the refinery was transported to Pakistan, where it was planned to be re-erected for the Indus Refinery Project. Suncor Energy (formerly Petro-Canada prior to merger in Aug 2009) still operates from the site as a storage terminal.

It was the third refinery to close along Lake Ontario; Shell's Oakville refinery was closed in 1983, and Esso's Mississauga, Ontario refinery located further east on Lakeshore Road closed in 1985.

Following the closing of the plant, the refinery was due to be dismantled and transported to Pakistan, where it would be reassembled for use there. However, this plan fell through due to investors withdrawing support from the project due to political instability in that country with only 65% of the plant transported to Pakistan. The remaining components were sold off in Canada to pay hauliers and other service-providers.
