= TransAsia Gas International =

Energy investment company based in Dubai, United Arab Emirates

TransAsia Gas International LLC is an energy investment company based in Dubai, United Arab Emirates. It is a subsidiary of Al-Ghurair Group.

== Operations ==
The company invest in oil and gas industry, power generation, and petrochemicals. It develops projects in Asia, the Middle East, and North Africa. Quantitatively, the key objective of Trans Asia Gas International is to produce over 400,000 barrels per day (64,000 m^{3}/d) within the next few years (equivalent to 18 million tonnes) petroleum products.

In 2007, Trans Asia Gas International invested in a power project in Pakistan, signed between ETA Star Group and Private Power and Infrastructure Board (PPIB).

In July 2008, TransAsia Gas International firmed up plans to relocate a $600 million refinery project from Italy to Pakistan. Also in 2008, the Star Consortium of TransAsia Gas International and Star Petro Energy signed a $2.5 billion agreement for a 50:50 joint venture with Libya's National Oil Corp (NOC). It has been interested to participate in the Iran–Pakistan–India gas pipeline project.

In Pakistan, the company has licences to build two 130 megawatt power plants.

== See also ==
- Abdul Aziz Al Ghurair
- ETA Star Group
