= Oakville, Ontario =

Town in Canada

Oakville
- Town (lower-tier)
- Town of Oakville
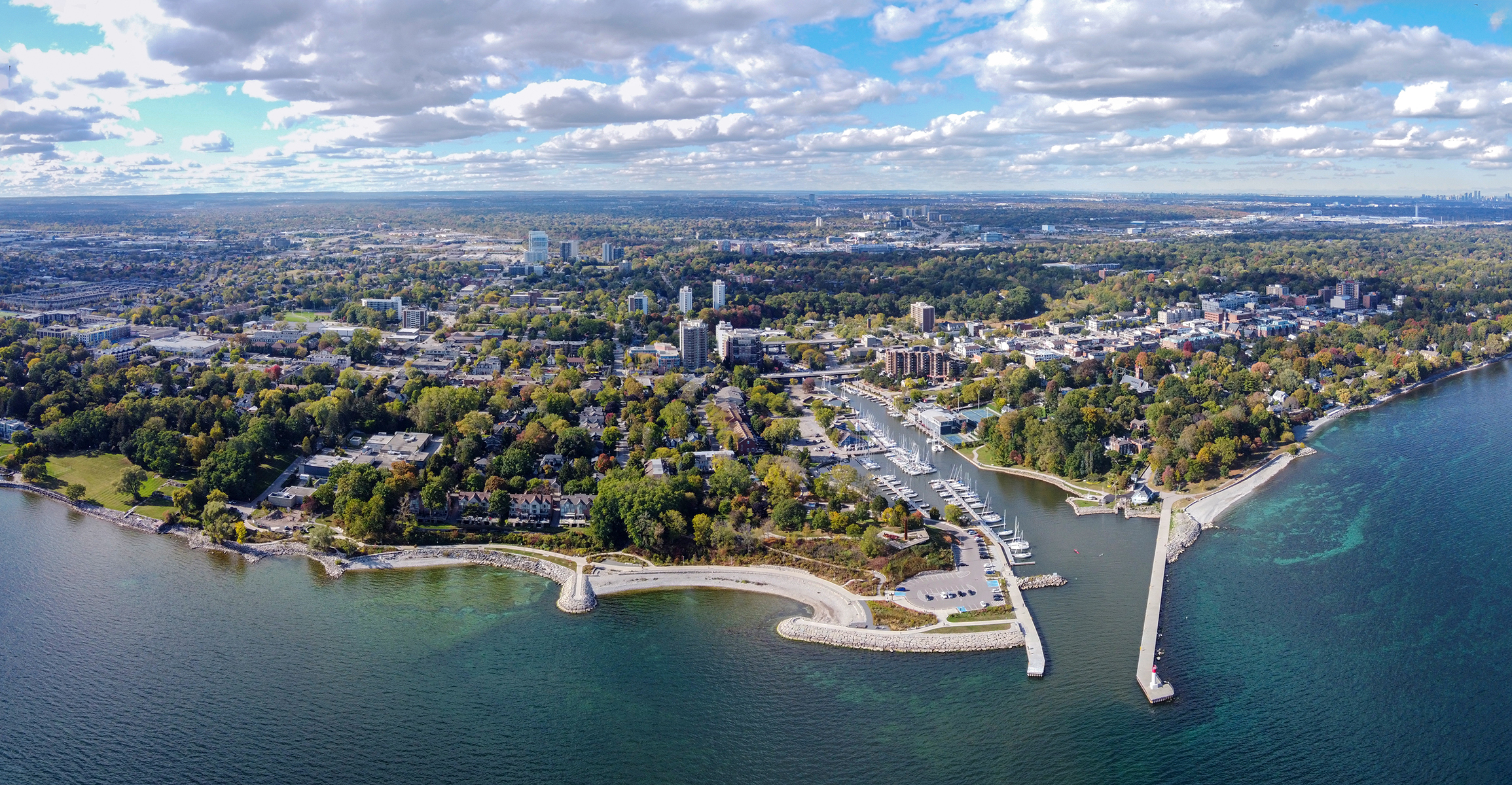
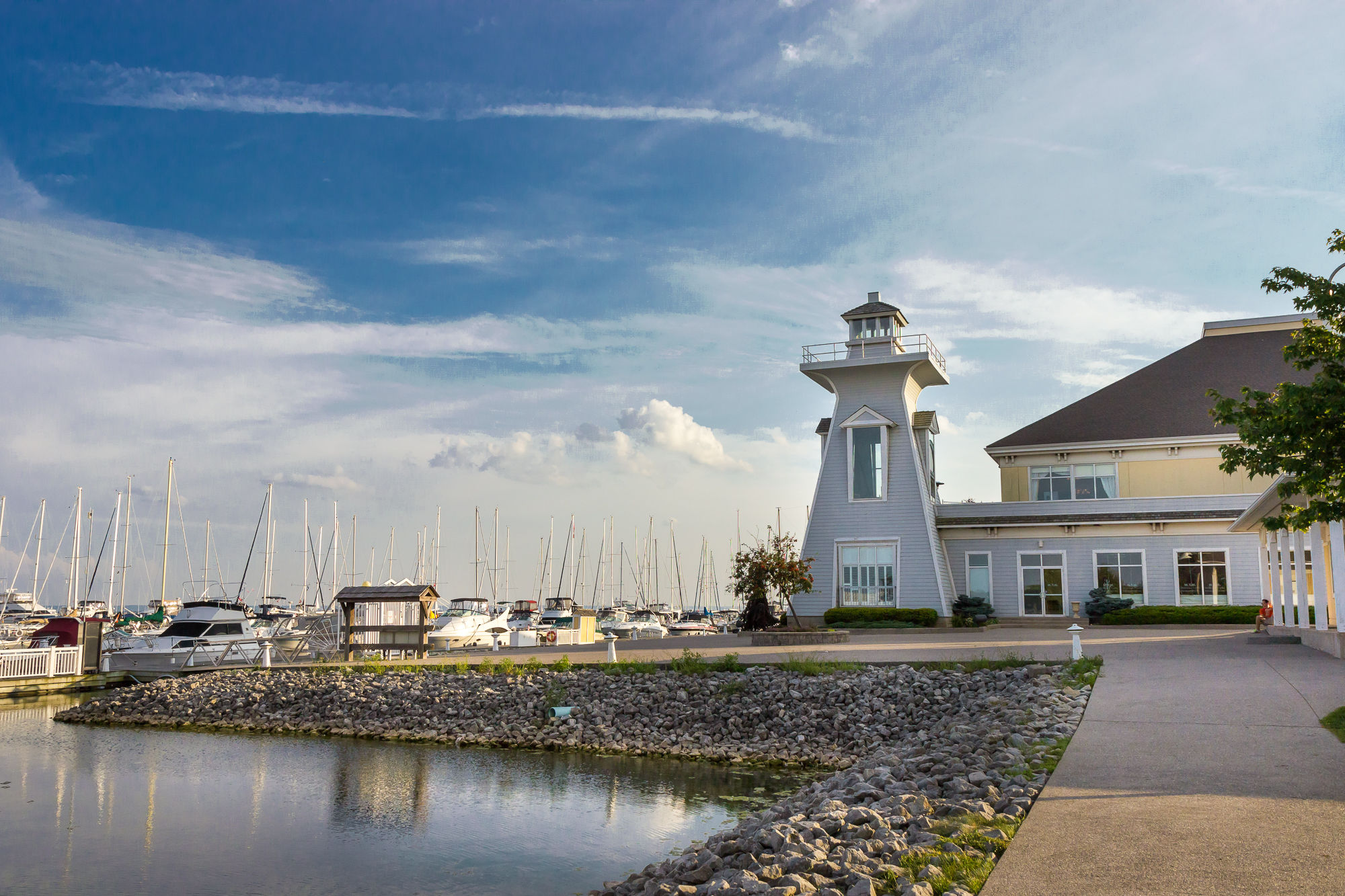
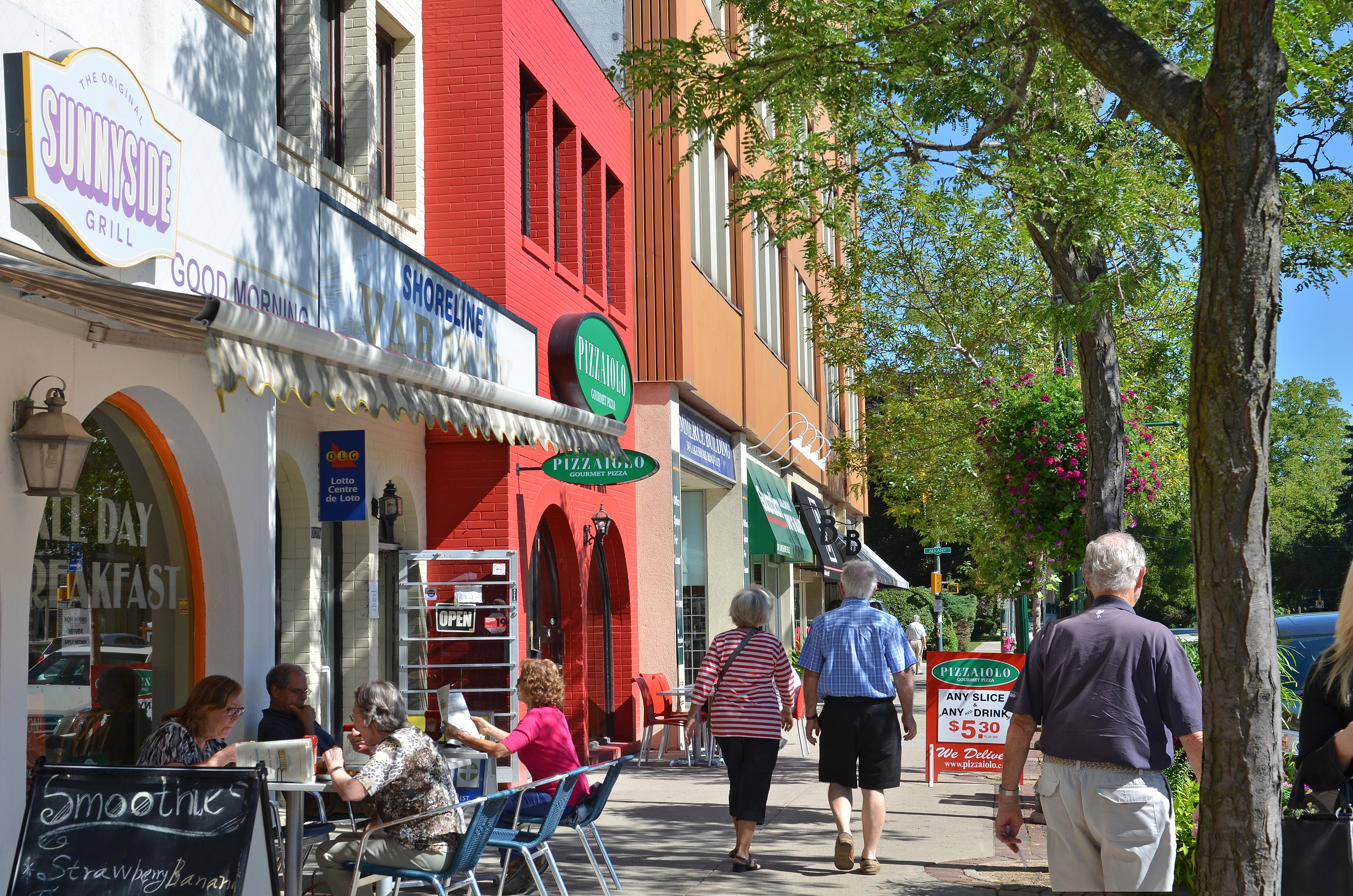
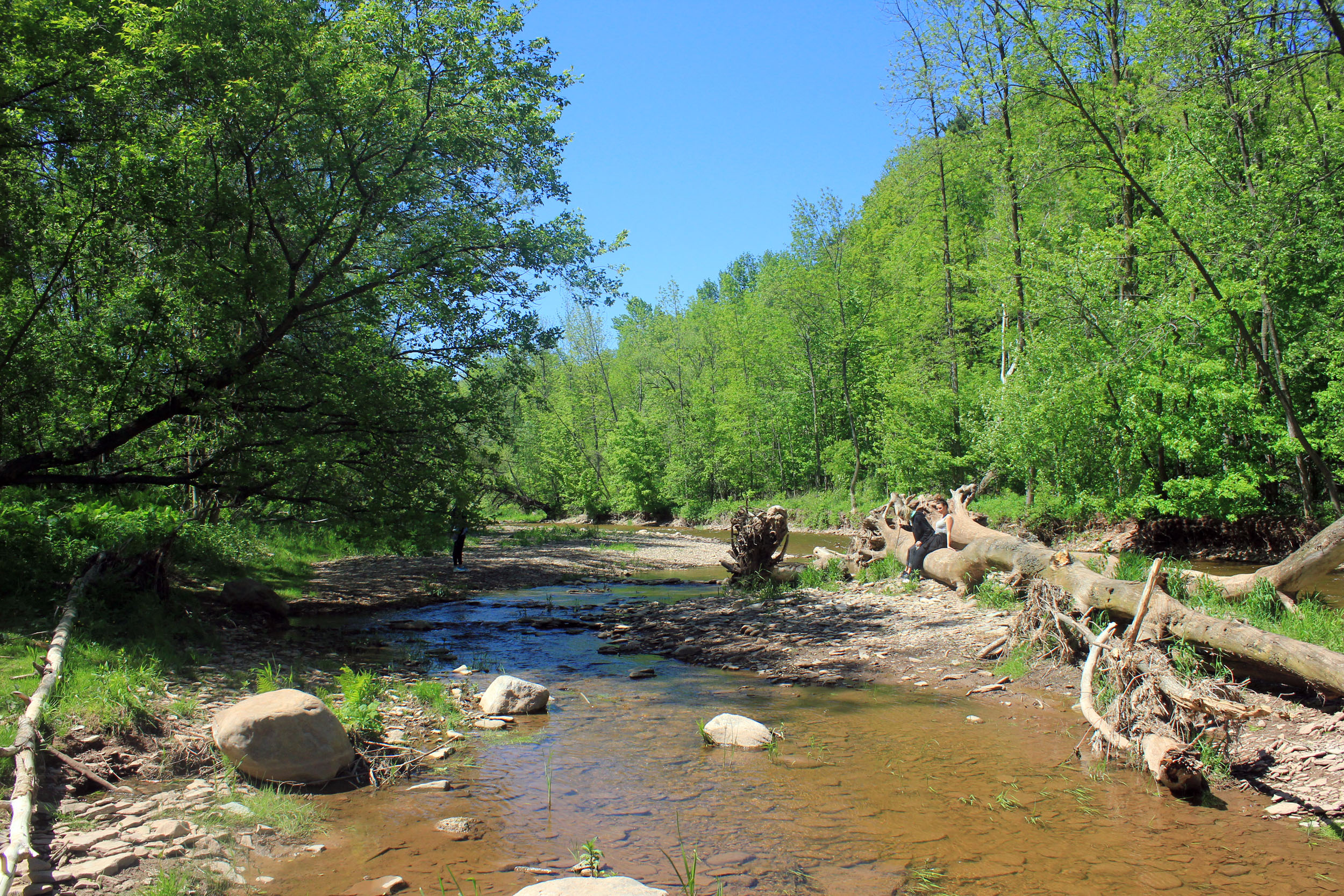
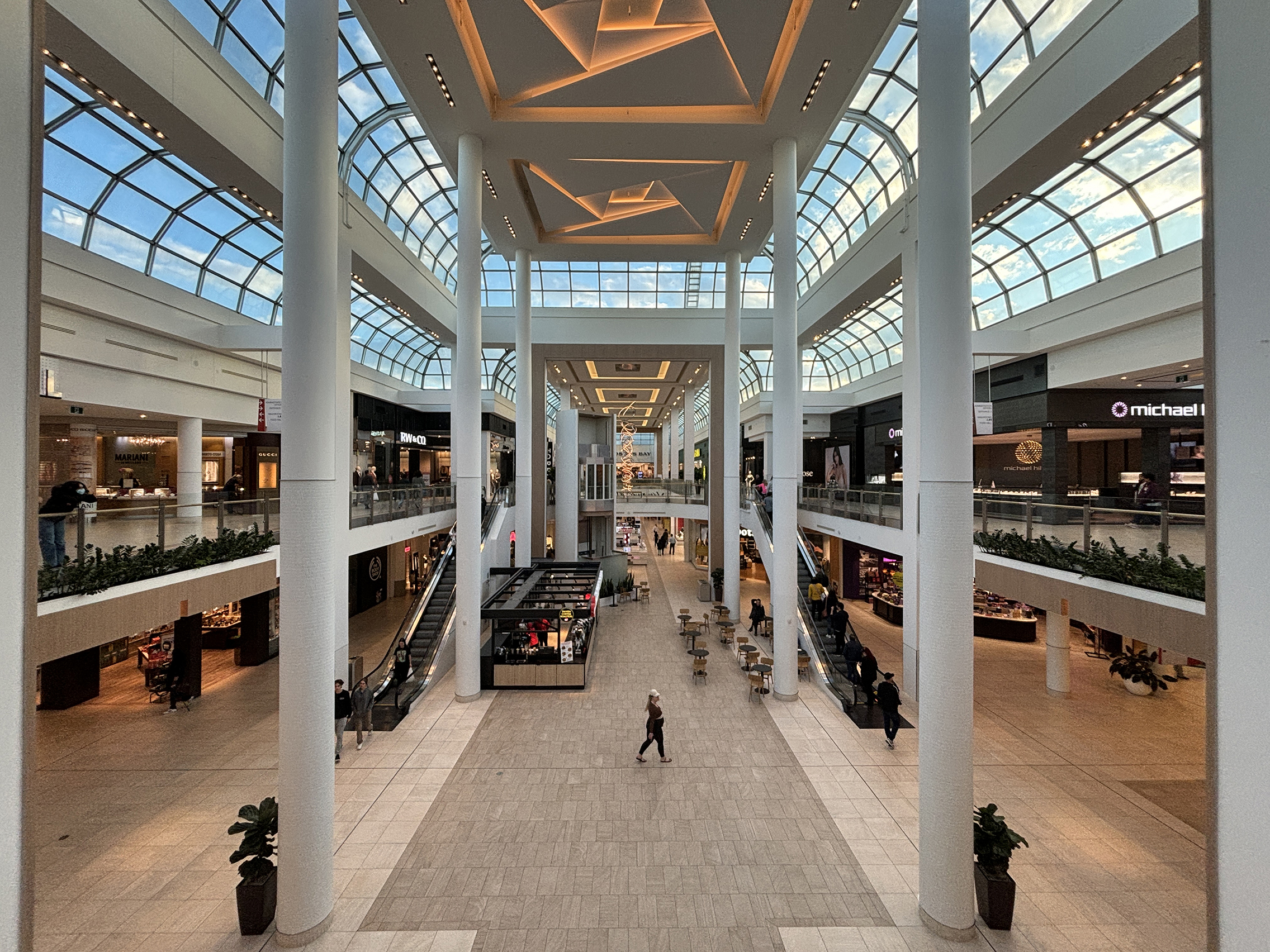
- Aerial view of Oakville in 2023 Bronte Harbour Downtown Oakville Bronte Creek Provincial Park Oakville Place

- Coat of arms Logo
- Motto: Avancez ("Go forward")
- Interactive map of Oakville
- Location within Southern Ontario Location within Regional Municipality of Halton
- Coordinates: 43°27′23″N 79°42′50″W
- Country: Canada
- Province: Ontario
- Region: Halton
- Wards: 7
- Neighbourhoods: 12
- Established: 1827

Government
  - Mayor: Jeff Knoll
  - Governing Body: Oakville Town Council
  - MPs, and MPPs: Sima Acan (L); Anita Anand (L); Stephen Crawford (PC); Effie Triantafilopoulos (PC)

Area (2021)
  - Land: 138.94 km^{2} (53.65 sq mi)
- Elevation: 173 m (568 ft)

Population (2021)
  - Total: 213,759 (25th)
  - Density: 1,538.5/km^{2} (3,985/sq mi)
- Demonym: Oakvillian
- Time zone: UTC−05:00 (EST)
  - Summer (DST): UTC−04:00 (EDT)
- Forward sortation area: L6H to L6M
- Area codes: 905, 289, 365, and 742
- Website: www.oakville.ca

Oakville is a town and the seat of Halton Region in Ontario, Canada. It borders Burlington to the southwest, Milton to the northwest and Mississauga to the northeast. In the 2021 Canadian census the town had a population of 213,759, with an estimated 233,700 people as of 2024, making it Ontario's largest town. Oakville is part of the Greater Toronto Area, the largest urban area in Canada.

== History ==
In 1793, Dundas Street was surveyed for a military road. In 1805, the Legislative Assembly of Upper Canada bought the lands between Etobicoke and Hamilton from the indigenous Mississaugas people, except for the land at the mouths of Twelve Mile Creek (Bronte Creek), Sixteen Mile Creek, and along the Credit River. In 1807, British immigrants settled the area surrounding Dundas Street as well as on the shore of Lake Ontario.

In 1820, the Crown bought the area surrounding the waterways. The area around the creeks, 390 ha (960 acres), ceded to the Crown by the Mississaugas, was auctioned off to William Chisholm in 1827. He left the development of the area to his son, Robert Kerr Chisholm, and his brother-in-law, Merrick Thomas. Chisholm also formed a shipbuilding business in Oakville Navy Street and Sixteen Mile Creek that lasted until 1842, although the shipbuilding industry in Oakville lasted into the late 20th century.

The population in 1846 was 1,500. The community shipped large quantities of wheat and lumber via schooners and the railway. There were three churches, a grist mill and saw mill, and various small companies making threshing machines, wagons, watches, saddles, and metal goods. There were also tradesmen of various types.

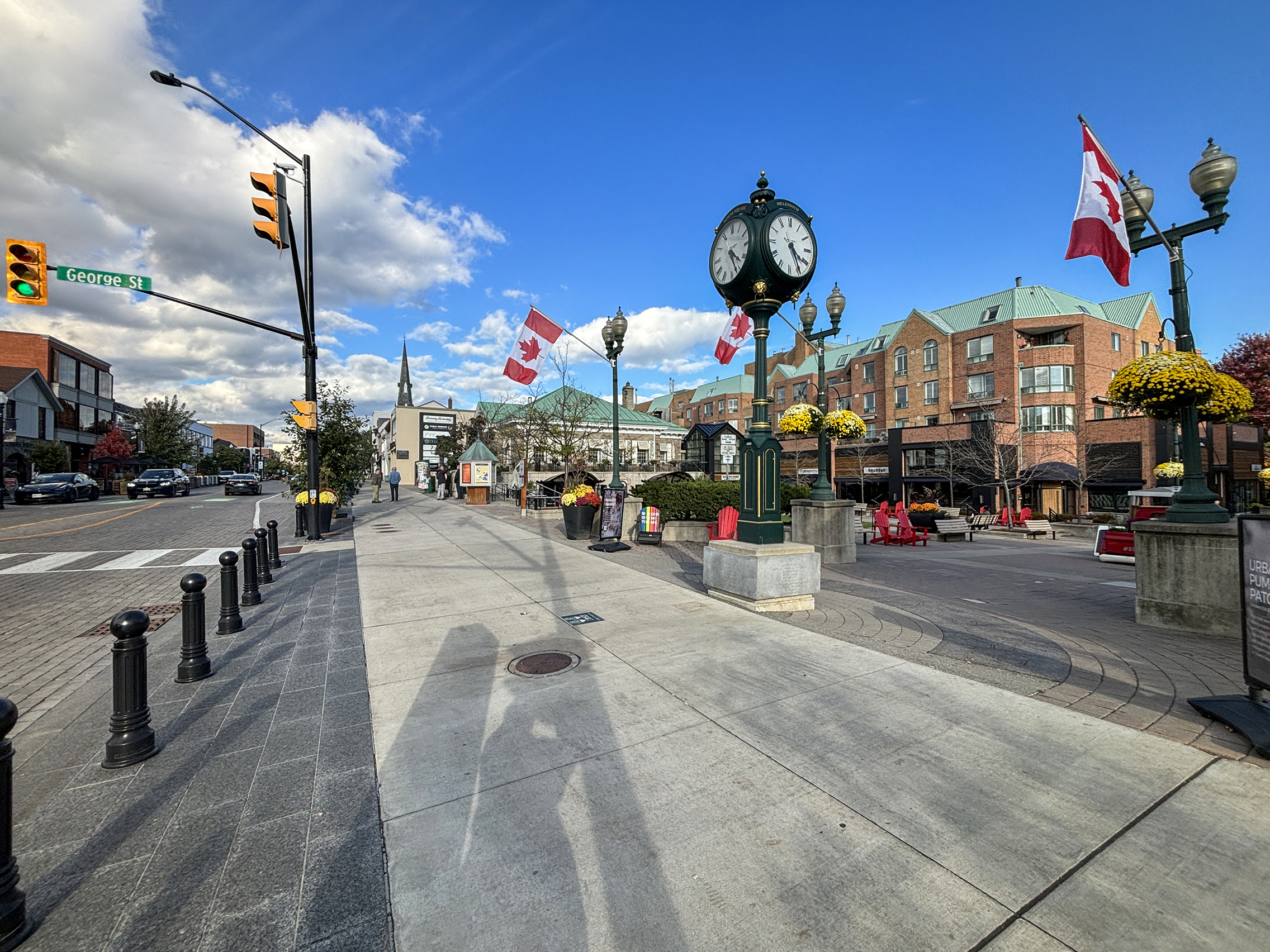
Town Square in Downtown Oakville

Oakville's industries also included shipbuilding. In the 1850s, there was an economic recession and the foundry, the most important industry in town, was closed. Basket-making became a major industry in the town, and the Grand Trunk Railway was built through it. In 1869, the population was 2,000. The community was served by the Great Western Railway and it was a port on Lake Ontario.

Oakville has a long and important role in Black Canadian historical narratives. The town is one of the many Underground Railroad Station Stops established along the Canada-U.S.A border. The town served as a location for fugitive enslaved Black people to escape the slavery of America and establish themselves. This population was very influential in establishing the town's prosperous economy.

Oakville's first electric lights were installed in 1889 on the west bank of Sixteen Mile Creek, in the area now known as Harbour Grove, to illuminate a temperance rally.

The town eventually became industrialized with the opening of the Cities Service Canada (later BP Canada, then Petro-Canada) and Shell Canada oil refineries (both now closed), the Procor factory (no longer manufacturing), and, most importantly, the Ford Motor Company's Canadian headquarters and plant, all close to the Canadian National Railway and the Queen Elizabeth Way highway between Toronto and Fort Erie (Buffalo).

In 1962, the town of Oakville merged with its neighbouring villages (Bronte, Palermo, Sheridan, and the remainder of Trafalgar Township) to become the new Town of Oakville, reaching northwards to Steeles Avenue in Milton. In 1973, the restructuring of Halton County into Halton Region brought the northern border southwards to just north of the future Highway 407.

In 1981, the Old Oakville Heritage Conservation District became the town's first designated heritage conservation district.

== Geography ==
=== Neighbourhoods ===
Oakville's Planning Department divides the town into communities. These are based on traditional neighbourhoods.

Neighbourhood	Description
Old Oakville	Old Oakville (downtown) is located in South-Central Oakville along the shore of Lake Ontario. It is bordered by the Sixteen Mile Creek and Oakville Harbour to the west, Chartwell Road to the east, and Cornwall Road to the north.
Kerr Village	Kerr Village is a section of downtown located just west of the Old Village around Kerr Street between Speers Rd and Lakeshore Road.
Bronte	Bronte is located in Southwest Oakville along the shore of Lake Ontario. It is a community centred on Bronte Harbour.
Eastlake	Eastlake is located in Southeast Oakville along the shore of Lake Ontario. It is often divided into the neighbourhoods of Morrison and Ford. It is bordered on the west by Chartwell Road, to the north by Cornwall Road, and to the east by Mississauga.
Clearview	Clearview is located in Centre East Oakville. It is located on the Oakville-Mississauga border.
College Park	College Park is located between Sixteen Mile Creek and just east of Trafalgar Road, from the Queen Elizabeth Way north to Upper Middle Road. It surrounds Sheridan College.
Iroquois Ridge North	Iroquois Ridge North is located in North East Oakville between Upper Middle Road and Dundas Street.
Iroquois Ridge South	Iroquois Ridge South is located in North East Oakville. The Falgarwood area is located in the southern end of the Iroquois Ridge South community.
Glen Abbey	Glen Abbey is located in West Oakville, with Third Line and Dorval Drive being the major arteries of the community. It is a large area west of the Glen Abbey Golf Course, home of the Canadian Open.
Palermo	Palermo is located in Northwest Oakville. It is a small community centred on the intersection of Dundas Street and Bronte Road (Highway 25).
River Oaks	River Oaks is located in North-Central Oakville. It includes the Oak Park development.
Uptown Core	Uptown Core is located in North Centre Oakville. It includes the area on either side of Trafalgar Road between Dundas Street and Glenashton Drive.
West Oak Trails	West Oak Trails is located in North Centre West Oakville on the north side of Upper Middle Road. It is a newer development than the other communities.

=== Climate ===
Like much of Southern Ontario, Oakville has a humid continental climate straddling Dfa/Dfb classifications, with cold winters with frequent snowfall, and warm summers. Like most lakeside municipalities on the Great Lakes, there are varying temperatures within town boundaries, generally warmer days further from the lake, the exception being on the colder days in winter.

Climate data for Oakville Southeast WPCP Climate ID: 615N745; coordinates 43°29′N 79°38′W; elevation: 86.9 m (285 ft); 1981–2010 normals, extremes 1971–2001
Month	Jan	Feb	Mar	Apr	May	Jun	Jul	Aug	Sep	Oct	Nov	Dec	Year
Record high °C (°F)	13.9 (57.0)	15.6 (60.1)	27.5 (81.5)	32.0 (89.6)	33.0 (91.4)	38.0 (100.4)	37.0 (98.6)	37.5 (99.5)	35.0 (95.0)	28.9 (84.0)	23.3 (73.9)	22.0 (71.6)	38.0 (100.4)
Mean daily maximum °C (°F)	−0.4 (31.3)	0.6 (33.1)	4.7 (40.5)	11.3 (52.3)	17.9 (64.2)	23.2 (73.8)	26.3 (79.3)	25.2 (77.4)	20.9 (69.6)	14.3 (57.7)	8.3 (46.9)	2.8 (37.0)	12.9 (55.2)
Daily mean °C (°F)	−4.7 (23.5)	−3.9 (25.0)	0.1 (32.2)	6.4 (43.5)	12.3 (54.1)	17.7 (63.9)	20.9 (69.6)	20.1 (68.2)	15.6 (60.1)	9.3 (48.7)	4.0 (39.2)	−1.3 (29.7)	8.1 (46.6)
Mean daily minimum °C (°F)	−8.9 (16.0)	−8.3 (17.1)	−4.5 (23.9)	1.5 (34.7)	6.8 (44.2)	12.1 (53.8)	15.4 (59.7)	15.0 (59.0)	10.2 (50.4)	4.3 (39.7)	−0.2 (31.6)	−5.5 (22.1)	3.2 (37.8)
Record low °C (°F)	−30.0 (−22.0)	−25.0 (−13.0)	−22.0 (−7.6)	−14.4 (6.1)	−3.3 (26.1)	1.1 (34.0)	7.0 (44.6)	3.0 (37.4)	−1.7 (28.9)	−7.0 (19.4)	−14.0 (6.8)	−27.0 (−16.6)	−30.0 (−22.0)
Average precipitation mm (inches)	59.8 (2.35)	46.7 (1.84)	54.4 (2.14)	65.2 (2.57)	73.9 (2.91)	71.0 (2.80)	75.8 (2.98)	78.3 (3.08)	73.5 (2.89)	70.0 (2.76)	79.3 (3.12)	58.8 (2.31)	806.7 (31.76)
Average rainfall mm (inches)	31.5 (1.24)	30.7 (1.21)	37.2 (1.46)	63.1 (2.48)	73.9 (2.91)	71.0 (2.80)	75.8 (2.98)	78.3 (3.08)	73.5 (2.89)	70.0 (2.76)	76.8 (3.02)	43.9 (1.73)	725.6 (28.57)
Average snowfall cm (inches)	28.3 (11.1)	16.1 (6.3)	17.2 (6.8)	2.1 (0.8)	0.0 (0.0)	0.0 (0.0)	0.0 (0.0)	0.0 (0.0)	0.0 (0.0)	0.0 (0.0)	2.5 (1.0)	14.9 (5.9)	81.0 (31.9)
Average precipitation days (≥ 0.2 mm)	9.6	7.2	9.0	11.1	10.4	10.3	8.8	9.8	10.2	10.4	11.1	9.7	117.6
Average rainy days (≥ 0.2 mm)	4.4	3.8	6.4	10.6	10.4	10.3	8.8	9.8	10.2	10.4	10.6	6.8	102.4
Average snowy days (≥ 0.2 cm)	5.6	3.7	3.2	0.7	0.0	0.0	0.0	0.0	0.0	0.0	1.0	3.4	17.6
Source: Environment and Climate Change Canada

== Demographics ==
Oakville
Year	Pop.	±%
1841	550	—
1871	1,684	+206.2%
1901	1,643	−2.4%
1911	2,372	+44.4%
1921	3,298	+39.0%
1931	3,857	+16.9%
1941	4,115	+6.7%
1951	6,910	+67.9%
1961	10,366	+50.0%
1971	61,483	+493.1%
1981	75,773	+23.2%
1991	114,670	+51.3%
1996	128,405	+12.0%
2001	144,738	+12.7%
2006	165,613	+14.4%
2011	182,520	+10.2%
2016	193,832	+6.2%
2021	213,759	+10.3%

In the 2021 Canadian census conducted by Statistics Canada, Oakville had a population of 213,759 living in 73,558 of its 76,179 total private dwellings, a change of 10.3% from its 2016 population of 193,832. With a land area of 138.94 km^{2} (53.65 sq mi), it had a population density of 1,538.5/km^{2} (3,984.7/sq mi) in 2021.

According to the 2021 census, the median age in the town is 41.6 years. 18% of the population is under 15 years of age, 66.3% is between 15 and 64 years, and 15.7% is 65 and over.

In 2021, immigrants made up 41.2% of the population. The top 10 places of birth of the immigrant population were China (15.3%), India (10.2%), United Kingdom (7.4%), Pakistan (5.7%), Philippines (3.4%), Egypt (3.3%), the United States (3.2%), Poland (2.7%), South Korea (2.5%), and Portugal (2.1%).

=== Language ===
The most common mother tongues among the population in 2021 were English (57.4%), Mandarin (7.0%), Arabic (3.5%), Spanish (2.3%), and Urdu (2.2%).

Mother tongue	Population	%
English	122,255	57.4
Mandarin	14,815	7.0
Arabic	7,350	3.5
Spanish	4,875	2.3
Urdu	4,605	2.2
Portuguese	3,500	1.6
French	2,970	1.4
Polish	2,910	1.4
Italian	2,800	1.3
Punjabi	2,540	1.2
Korean	2,475	1.2
Hindi	2,285	1.1
Tagalog (Filipino)	1,840	0.9
Croatian	1,635	0.8
Russian	1,400	0.7
Cantonese	1,340	0.6
Persian	1,330	0.7
Serbian	1,295	0.6
German	1,220	0.6
Romanian	1,025	0.5

=== Ethnicity ===
The 2016 census found the most reported ethnocultural background to be White (68.5%), followed by South Asian (8.9%), Chinese (7%), Arab (3.2%), Black (2.9%), Filipino (1.9%), Latin American (1.9%), Korean (1.6%), West Asian (1.1%), and other backgrounds. Aboriginals make up 0.7% of the population: 0.4% First Nations and 0.3% Métis.

Ethnic origins (2016)	Population	%
English	42,280	22.1
Canadian	32,415	16.9
Scottish	31,525	16.4
Irish	30,880	16.1
Italian	16,900	8.8
German	15,500	8.1
Chinese	14,840	7.7
French	14,250	7.4
East Indian	12,615	6.6
Polish	9,890	5.2
Portuguese	7,550	3.9
Ukrainian	6,990	3.6
Dutch	5,880	3.1

Panethnic groups in the Town of Oakville (2001–2021)
Panethnic group	2021		2016		2011		2006		2001	
Panethnic group	Pop.	%	Pop.	%	Pop.	%	Pop.	%	Pop.	%
European (Note: Statistic includes all persons that did not make up part of a visible minority or an indigenous identity.)	120,515	56.83%	131,230	68.45%	138,170	76.58%	133,505	81.17%	124,535	86.67%
South Asian	28,685	13.53%	17,095	8.92%	12,935	7.17%	9,945	6.05%	6,275	4.37%
East Asian (Note: Statistic includes total responses of "Chinese", "Korean", and "Japanese" under visible minority section on census.)	27,155	12.81%	17,205	8.97%	9,500	5.27%	7,575	4.61%	4,350	3.03%
Middle Eastern (Note: Statistic includes total responses of "West Asian" and "Arab" under visible minority section on census.)	12,500	5.89%	8,185	4.27%	4,140	2.29%	2,745	1.67%	1,410	0.98%
Southeast Asian (Note: Statistic includes total responses of "Filipino" and "Southeast Asian" under visible minority section on census.)	5,770	2.72%	4,740	2.47%	4,930	2.73%	3,130	1.9%	2,040	1.42%
African	7,020	3.31%	5,520	2.88%	4,820	2.67%	3,535	2.15%	2,770	1.93%
Latin American	4,265	2.01%	3,595	1.88%	2,640	1.46%	1,640	1%	730	0.51%
Indigenous	1,415	0.67%	1,415	0.74%	1,160	0.64%	665	0.4%	520	0.36%
Other/Multiracial (Note: Statistic includes total responses of "Visible minority, n.i.e." and "Multiple visible minorities" under visible minority section on census.)	4,735	2.23%	2,730	1.42%	2,150	1.19%	1,740	1.06%	1,065	0.74%
Total responses	212,060	99.21%	191,720	98.91%	180,430	98.85%	164,485	99.32%	143,685	99.27%
Total population	213,759	100%	193,832	100%	182,520	100%	165,613	100%	144,738	100%
Note: Totals greater than 100% due to multiple origin responses

=== Religion ===
According to the 2021 census, 52.7% of the population identify as Christians, with Catholics (28.8%) making up the largest denomination. Others identify as Muslims (10.4%), Hindus (4.5%), Sikhs (1.9%), Buddhists (1.1%), Jewish (0.6%), and with other religions. A total of 28.3% of the population report no religious affiliation.

== Economy ==
The top employers in Oakville include:

Company / organization	Employees	Sector
Ford Motor Company of Canada	4,110	Head Office & Automobile Manufacturing Plant
Halton Healthcare	2,626	Healthcare Services
Halton District School Board	2,441	Education
Regional Municipality of Halton	1,542	Regional Government
Collins Aerospace	1,500	Aerospace Products & Parts Manufacturing
The Corporation of the Town of Oakville	1279	Municipal Government
Halton Catholic District School Board	1,094	Education
Sheridan College	1,031	Education, Post-Secondary Institution

== Arts and culture ==
=== Oakville Centre for the Performing Arts ===
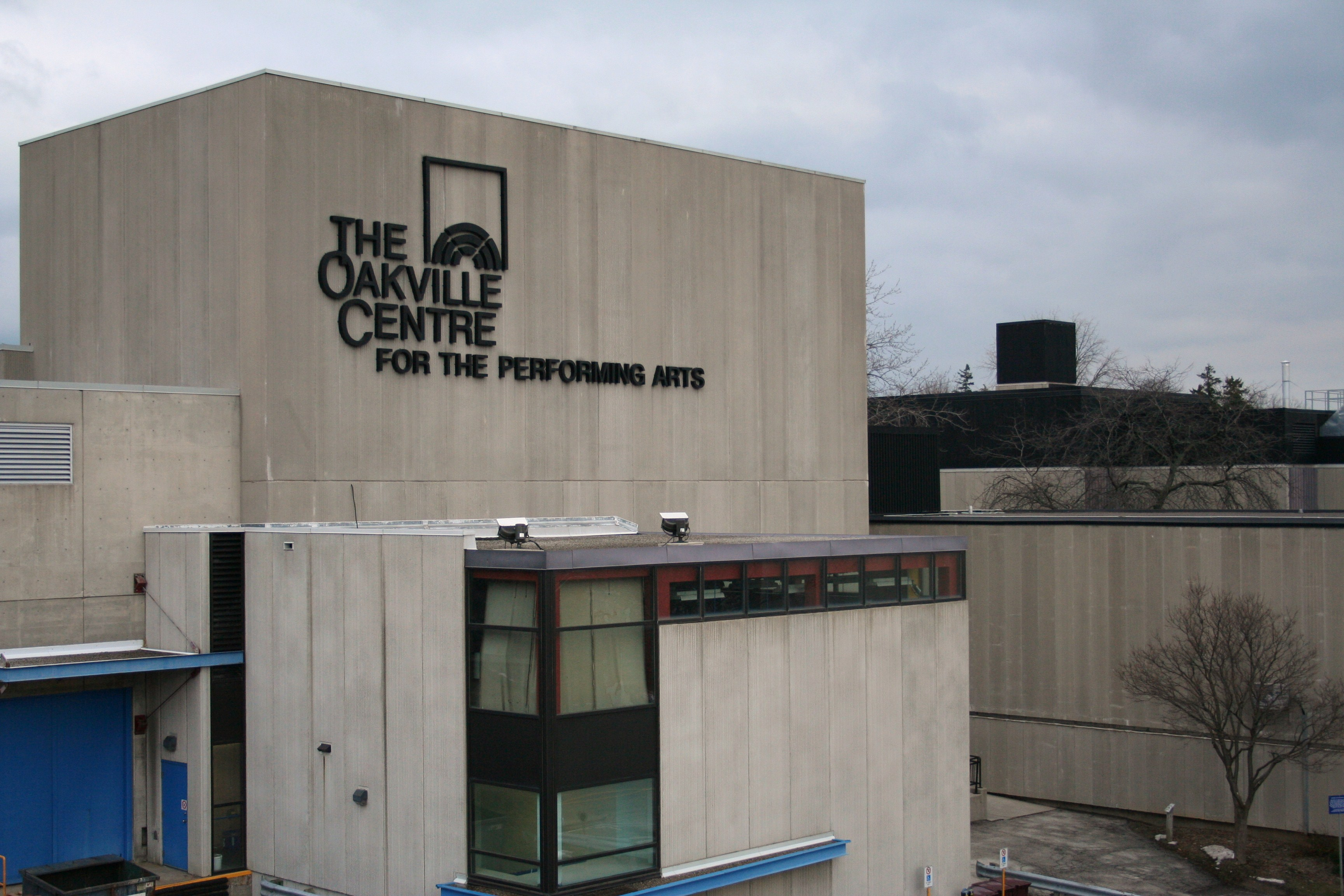
Oakville Centre for the Performing Arts

The Oakville Centre for the Performing Arts houses several performances by local and international artists. It is also the performing venue for the Oakville Symphony Orchestra, the Oakville Children's Choir and the Oakville Ballet Company. The Oakville Arts Council provides further artistic talents in the town showcasing films, literary figures and visual arts.

=== The Oakville Children's Choir ===
The Oakville Children's Choir has been in business since 1994.

=== Oakville Galleries ===
Oakville Galleries is a not-for-profit art museum that exhibits contemporary art, cares for a permanent collection and delivers public programming. Its exhibition spaces are located on two sites: Gairloch Gardens and Centennial Square.

=== Events ===
==== Downtown Oakville Jazz Festival ====
The Downtown Oakville Jazz Festival is an annual summer jazz festival established in 1992. The event includes performances at a number of stages along Lakeshore Road in downtown Oakville. The event is free to the public.

==== Waterfront Festival ====
Beginning in 1982, Oakville's Coronation Park played host to the annual Oakville Waterfront Festival. Among a range of events, the festival included small amusement park rides, arts and crafts, food and drinks, free concerts headlined by Canadian bands, and nightly fireworks displays. The Waterfront Festival took place in late June of each year until 2010, when it was cancelled due to financial difficulties, despite having annual attendance of up to 100,000 visitors. It returned in August 2013, which was the most recent festival to date.

==== Kerrfest ====
Kerrfest is an annual outdoor music festival that takes place in early September in Oakville. Having begun in 2014, the event includes free performances and is open to the public, located at Westwood Park.

==== Midnight Madness ====
Midnight Madness was a street festival that happened one night each summer. It ran for over 40 years, until it was cancelled in 2023. It would attract thousands of visitors to Downtown Oakville.

==== For the Love of the Arts Festival ====
The For the Love of the Arts Festival is an annual event taking place in the late spring in Oakville. Inaugurated in 2002, the event is hosted by CommUnity Arts Space (originally known as Music and Art Shared Space who initiated the festival), a local umbrella group advocating for shared physical space for Oakville's arts and cultural groups. Currently the only such multi-disciplinary community festival of its kind in Oakville, the event serves to showcase local talent, skills, crafts, literary art, dance performances, theatre groups and music performances. The event is intended as a symbolic presentation of a "shared space" and is entirely sponsored by local corporate and private donations.

==== Northeast Oakville Fair ====
The Northeast Oakville Fair is an annual event that takes place toward the end of spring across from the Iroquois Ridge Community Centre. The fair brings together local businesses, inflatables, food trucks, hot air balloon rides, family activities, and a DJ that's free and open to the public.

=== Shopping ===
Oakville Place is an indoor shopping mall in Oakville that opened in 1981. The mall is approximately 42,000 square metres (452,000 sq ft).

== Sports ==
=== Athletics ===
The Oakville Half Marathon is an annual half marathon event held in Shell Park, with sub-events in 10K, 5K, and 2K Fun Run/Walk.

=== Golf ===
Glen Abbey Golf Course is located in Oakville. Designed by Jack Nicklaus, the course has hosted 30 Canadian Open championships since it opened in 1977, and both Golf Canada and the Canadian Golf Hall of Fame are located there. In 2018, the owner, Clublink, planned to demolish the golf course in order to build residential and commercial properties. In 2021, following objections from the community and municipal government, Clublink withdrew its development plan and stated it would continue operating Glen Abbey as a golf course.

=== Soccer ===
Oakville SC is a semi-professional and youth soccer club that competes in League1 Ontario. Oakville boasts over 60 soccer fields and a Soccer Club Facility with a two-star, full-size, FIFA-Certified indoor soccer pitch.

=== Lacrosse ===
Oakville is home to the headquarters and practice facilities of the Toronto Rock professional box lacrosse team competing in the National Lacrosse League. Oakville is also home to the 3rd largest minor lacrosse association in Ontario: The Oakville Minor Lacrosse Association has more than 1,500 players and competes in multiple classes and multiple divisions. The town also has the Oakville Buzz, a Junior "A" lacrosse team who won the Founders Cup in 2006. The current rep lacrosse team is the Oakville Hawks.

=== Hockey ===
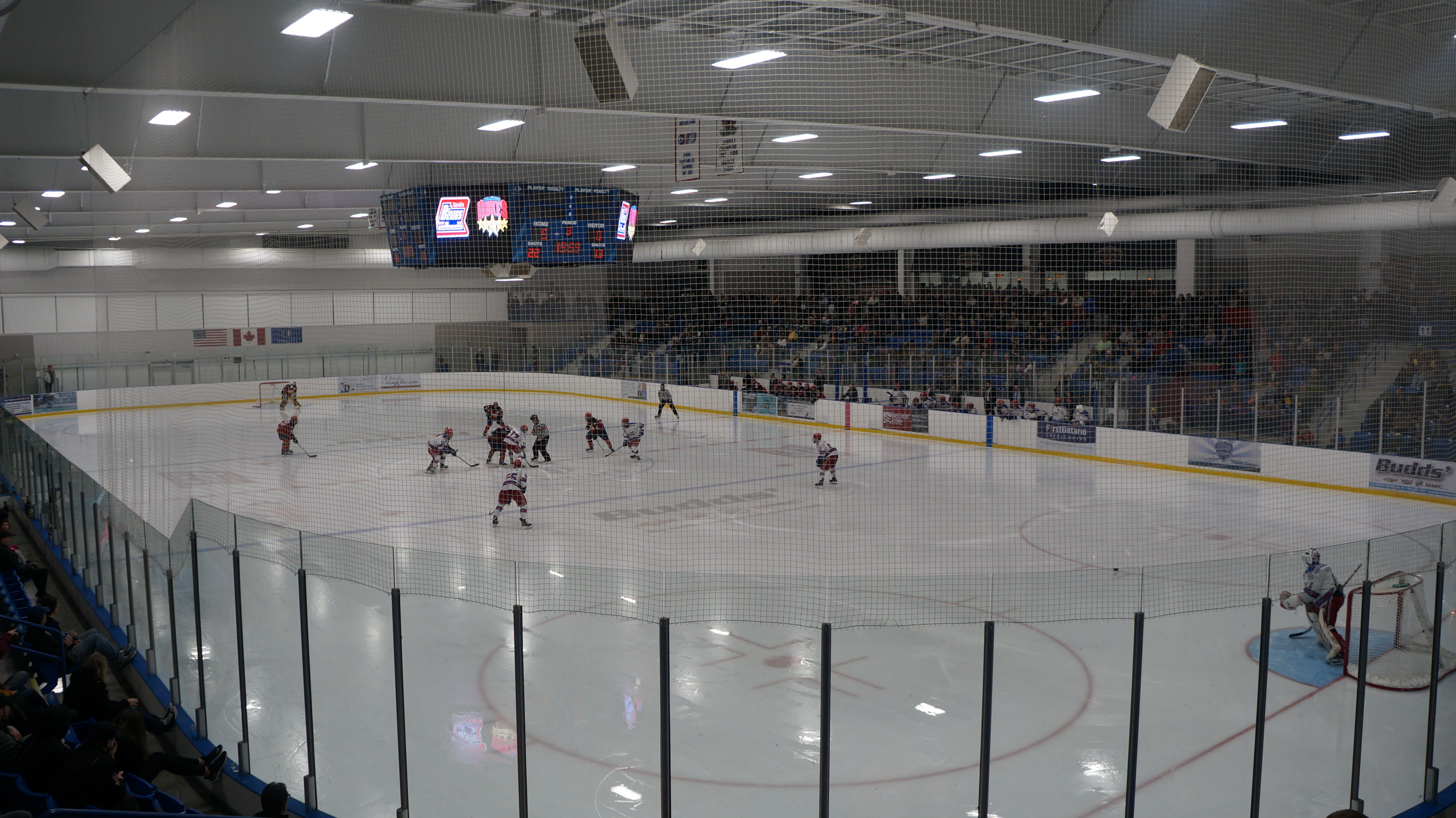
Oakville Blades home game

The Oakville Blades is a Tier II Junior "A" franchise since 1966, and a "AAA" hockey system. The current rep hockey team for boys in Oakville is the Oakville Rangers. For girls, there is the Oakville Hornets.

=== Skating ===
Skate Oakville, which is headquartered at Oakville's Sixteen Mile Creek Sports Complex, was recently the largest skating club in Canada, providing learn to skate lessons, recreational figure skating programs, competitive training, and 10 synchronised skating teams.

=== Swimming ===
Competitive swimming in Oakville is represented by two organizations: Oakville Aquatic Club (OAK) and Dolphins Swim Club.

Oakville Aquatic Club is affiliated with Swimming Canada and Swim Ontario. OAK offers four levels of swimming based on age and skill: Acorns, Mini Oaks, Development, and Performance.

Lake Ontario Swim Team (L.O.S.T.) is an open-water swim team founded in 2006 by Rob Kent while he was training for his English Channel attempt. The team meets every Saturday morning from June to mid-September at Oakville Harbour. As of 2019, it had over 200 swimmers. The LOST Race, organized by L.O.S.T. members since 2008, is an annual 3.8 km race (Ironman distance) from Edgemere Promenade to Oakville Harbour.

=== Canoeing ===
Burloak Canoe Club is located in Oakville. Three Olympians, Adam van Koeverden, Mark Oldershaw and Larry Cain, trained at the club.

== Government ==
Official emblazonment of the city's coat of arms

=== Municipal and regional ===
At the municipal level, the governing body is the Oakville Town Council consisting of a mayor (currently Rob Burton) and fourteen councillors. The town is divided into seven wards, with two councillors elected by residents of each ward.

In each ward, one councillor represents the ward solely on the Oakville Town Council, and the other is a member of the 21-member governing council of the Regional Municipality of Halton, in addition to being a member of the 14-member Town Council.

=== Provincial ===
Oakville provincial election results
Year	PC		New Democratic		Liberal		Green	
2022	44%	32,364	8%	5,556	37%	26,978	5%	3,505
2018	45%	39,032	19%	16,524	32%	28,237	4%	3,068

Two provincial ridings are situated in Oakville, which use the same boundaries as the federal ridings and are currently represented provincially by:

- Oakville: Stephen Crawford (Conservative)
- Oakville North-Burlington: Effie Triantafilopoulos (Conservative)

=== Federal ===
Oakville federal election results
Year	Liberal		Conservative		New Democratic		Green	
2021	47%	46,371	39%	38,495	9%	8,934	2%	1,660
2019	47%	49,534	39%	40,605	8%	7,976	5%	5,269

Two federal ridings are situated in Oakville, which are currently represented by:

- Oakville East: Anita Anand (Liberal)
- Oakville West: Sima Acan (Liberal)

== Infrastructure ==
=== Transportation ===
==== Public transit ====
Local bus service is provided by Oakville Transit with some bus lines extending as far as Highway 407 & Dundas Carpool Lot in Burlington and South Common Centre in Mississauga. Its bus services are focused on servicing passengers using the Lakeshore West line from four different GO stations within or near Oakville. GO Transit commuter rail and bus service operate from Bronte GO and Oakville GO stations. Via Rail operates services along the line as part of the Quebec City–Windsor Corridor, and operates from Oakville station.

==== Roads and highways ====
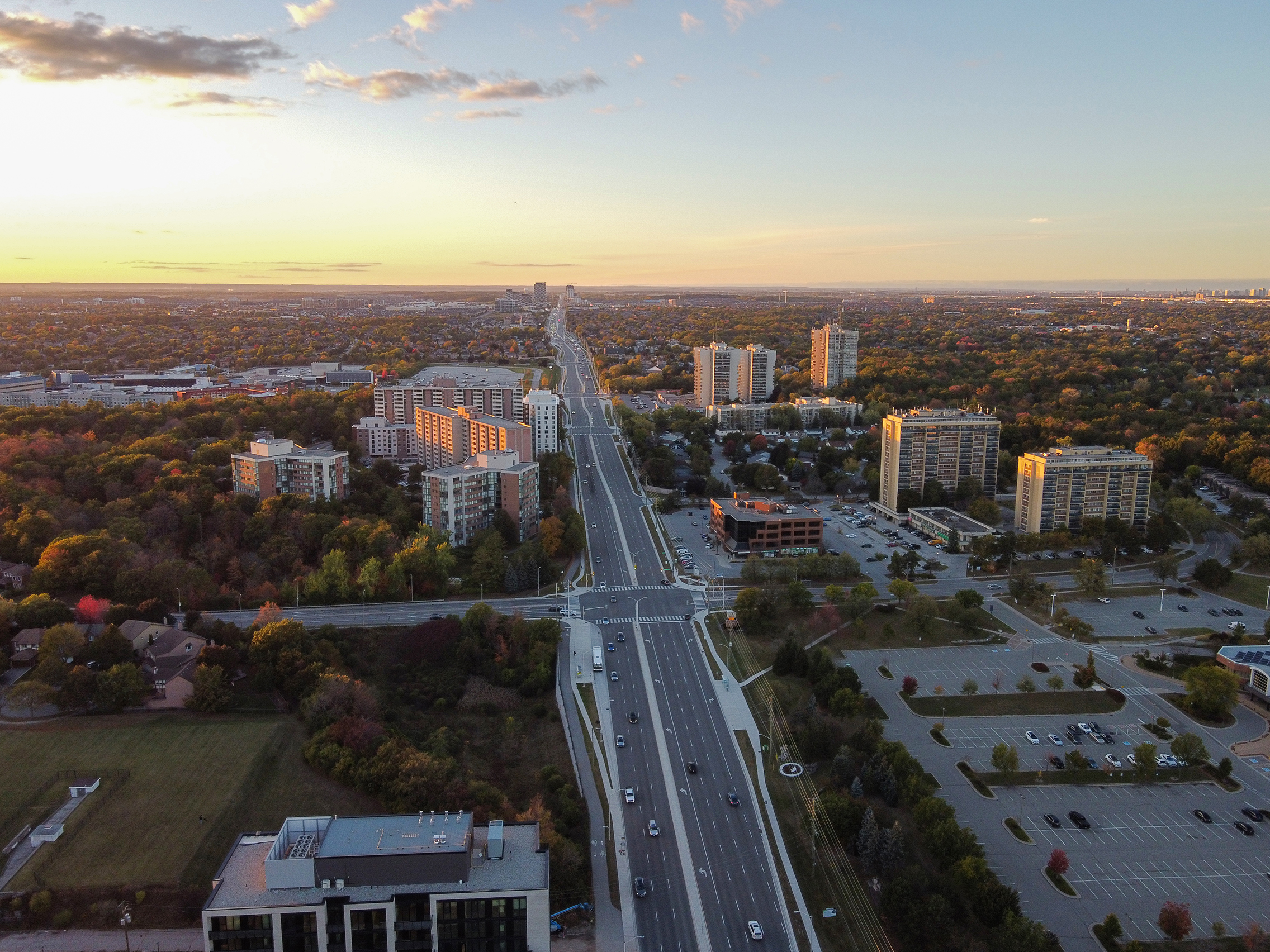
Trafalgar Road view to Uptown in 2023

Several major roads and highways go through Oakville:

- Queen Elizabeth Way
- Highway 403
  - The Queen Elizabeth Way and Ontario Highway 403 run concurrently throughout most of Oakville.
- 407 ETR
- Regional Road 25 (Bronte Road)
- Dundas Street
- Lakeshore Road (West/East)
- Trafalgar Road
- Dorval Drive
- Neyagawa Boulevard
- Winston Churchill Boulevard (Boundary with the City of Mississauga & Peel Region)
- Burloak Drive (Boundary with the City of Burlington)
- William Halton Parkway
  - Section of new road between Third Line and Neyagawa Boulevard is currently under construction.

=== Emergency services ===
Law enforcement in Oakville is performed by the Halton Regional Police Service.

Fire service is provided by the Oakville Fire Department with its nine fire stations.

Oakville Marine Search and Rescue is a volunteer marine search and rescue organization based in Oakville Harbour that provides services on western Lake Ontario. The organization was founded in 1954 and was a charter member of the Canadian Coast Guard Auxiliary.

== Education ==
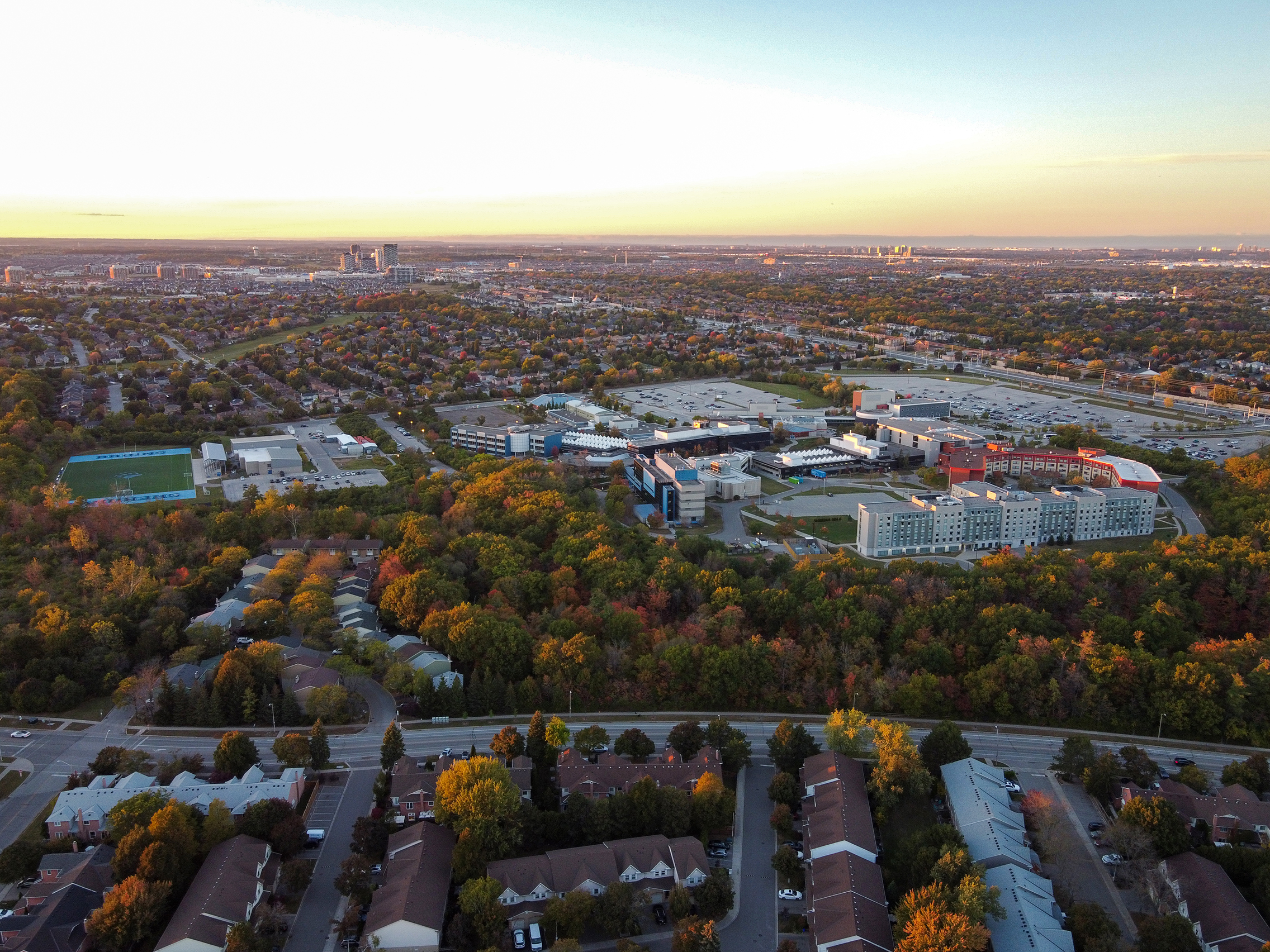
Trafalgar Campus of Sheridan College

Elementary schools and high schools in Oakville are a mix of private and public schools, with one of the highest ratios of private schools to student population in the country. Oakville is covered by the Halton District School Board, Halton Catholic District School Board, Conseil scolaire Viamonde, and Conseil scolaire catholique MonAvenir. St. Thomas Aquinas Catholic Secondary School (Oakville) and White Oaks Secondary School both offer the International Baccalaureate Program.

The town is home to Appleby College, a private school for grades seven to twelve, established in 1911 as well as St. Mildred's-Lightbourn School, an independent all-girls school. Oakville is also home to the Trafalgar Campus of Sheridan College, primarily an arts and business studies institute, and Oakville's only higher education facility.

== Media ==
Oakville is primarily served by media based in Toronto with markets in the Greater Toronto Area (GTA) that cover most of the news in the GTA. One regional newspaper, the Oakville Beaver, is published once weekly. The monthly magazines Neighbours of Joshua Creek, Neighbours of Glen Abbey and Neighbours of Olde Oakville serve three key neighbourhoods. The town is also served by Oakvillenews.org, a locally owned online daily newsletter and website.

The town also has two specialty radio stations: AM 1250 CJYE, a Christian music station and AM 1320 CJMR, a Multicultural station.

The following national cable television station also broadcast from Oakville:

- The Weather Network has broadcast nationally from Oakville since 2005.
- The Hamilton-based television station CHCH-DT serves Hamilton, the regional municipalities of Halton and Niagara, thus including Oakville. CHCH recently closed its Halton Bureau (due to budget considerations) which was located in downtown Oakville.
- YourTV from the studio in the Cogeco headquarters at Harvester Road & Burloak Drive, just inside of Burlington.

== Sister cities ==
Oakville is twinned with the following cities:

- Dorval, Quebec, Canada (1957)
  - Dorval Drive in Oakville is named after this city.
- Neyagawa, Osaka, Japan (April 6, 1984)
  - Neyagawa Boulevard in Oakville named after this city.
  - An apartment complex in Neyagawa is named after Oakville.
- Huai'an, Jiangsu, China (June, 2015)

== See also ==
- Category:People from Oakville, Ontario
- List of people from Oakville, Ontario
- List of schools in Oakville, Ontario
