= Growth Plan =

Growth Plan may refer to:

- Growth and Transformation Plan, a national five-year plan introduced by the Ethiopian government in 2011
- Growth Plan for the Greater Golden Horseshoe, 2006 regional growth management policy for the Greater Golden Horseshoe area of southern Ontario, Canada
- September 2022 United Kingdom mini-budget, known officially as "The Growth Plan"

== See also ==
- Growth planning
