= Greenbelt (Golden Horseshoe) =

Protected area in Southern Ontario, Canada

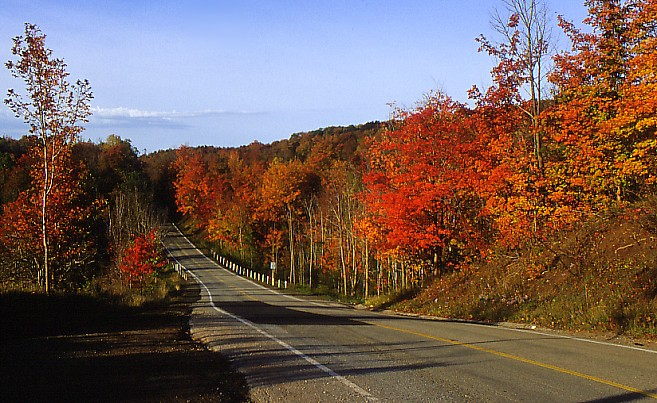
- Lower Base Line Road outside of Toronto
- Interactive map of Greenbelt
- Location: Southern Ontario, Canada
- Coordinates: 43°53′N 80°00′W
- Area: 2,000,000 acres (810,000 ha; 8,100 km^{2})
- Established: 2005
- Website: www.greenbelt.ca

The Greenbelt is a protected area of green space, farmland, forests, wetlands, and watersheds, located in Southern Ontario, Canada. It surrounds a significant portion of the Golden Horseshoe.

Created by legislation passed by the Government of Ontario in 2005, the Greenbelt is considered a prevention of urban development and sprawl on environmentally sensitive land in the province. According to the Greenbelt Foundation, the Greenbelt includes 2,000,000 acres (810,000 ha; 8,100 km^{2}) of land. That includes 721,000 acres (292,000 ha; 2,920 km^{2}) of protected wetlands, grasslands, and forests.

== History ==
The Greenbelt was established around the Golden Horseshoe, one of the fastest growing urban areas in North America. The population in the region increased from 6.5 to 7.7 million between 1991 and 2001. The population increase put urban development pressure on areas surrounding Greater Toronto and Hamilton. Between 1996 and 2001, the amount of farmland decreased by 7% in the GTA, and by 6% in Hamilton. The Golden Horseshoe's population is projected to increase to 11.5 million by 2031.

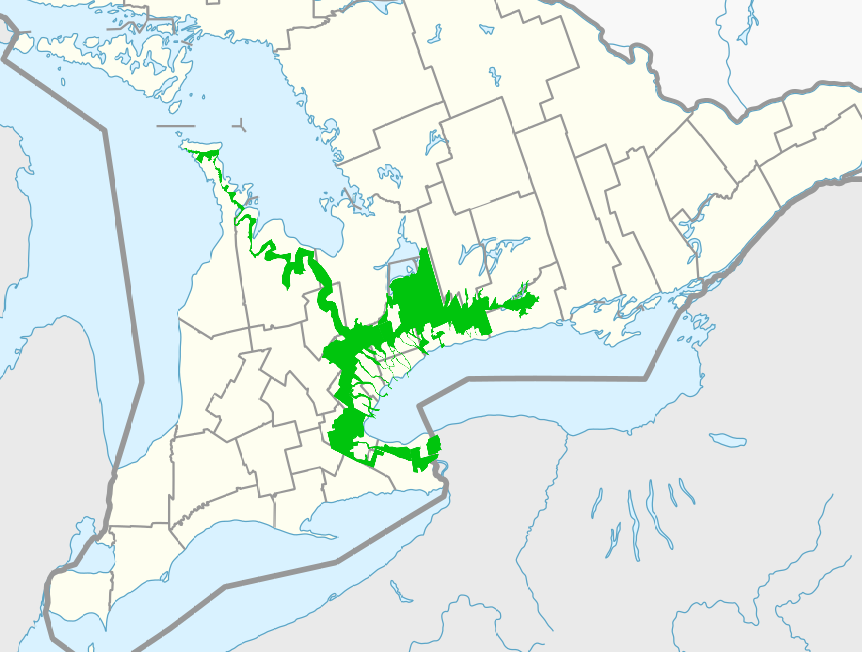
A map showing the general areas of the Greenbelt and other related zones protected from urban development.

The idea of establishing a greenbelt in Ontario was created by Premier of Ontario Dalton McGuinty in his Speech from the Throne in November 2003. Bill 27, the Greenbelt Protection Act, 2004 became law on June 24, 2004. The new legislation, in conjunction with a zoning order issued by the Minister of Municipal Affairs and Housing, created a study area and placed a moratorium on some land uses until a specific plan was established. Bill 135, the Greenbelt Act, 2005 was introduced to the Legislative Assembly of Ontario for first reading of the bill in October 2004, and became law on February 28, 2005. It now provides permanent protection for the Greenbelt area.

In 2015, the Greenbelt Plan started its 10-year review in coordination with the Growth Plan for the Greater Golden Horseshoe, the Niagara Escarpment Plan, and the Oak Ridges Moraine Conservation Plan. As part of the review, the Province gathered public feedback through a series of community meetings and online engagement. The Province released a discussion document to "help inform and guide discussions." The deadline for feedback on the proposed changes for the Co-ordinated Land Use Planning Review was 31 October 2016 and the Provincial Government expected to release specifics about the future plan in "early 2017".

The Building Industry and Land Development Association, a lobby group for the development and construction industry in Ontario, claimed that the Greenbelt and other anti-sprawl policies are responsible for the lack of affordable housing in southern Ontario. Urban planners dispute this, stating that large amounts of land in southern Ontario set aside for development remained unused as of 2016 and would be sufficient to support over a decade of new development.

Facing pressure from realtors and home builders to decrease the size of the Greenbelt to allow for expansion of housing developments, Premier Kathleen Wynne said that the 27 April 2017 Provincial Budget will not diminish the protected lands. "We're committed to growing the Greenbelt not shrinking the Greenbelt," she explained. According to the Neptis Foundation (a publisher of nonpartisan research on urban regions), there are roughly 45,000 acres (18,000 ha; 180 km^{2}) still available for development in the GTHA, adequate until at least 2031.

Research conducted by the CBC confirms that a great deal of land is available in both Halton Region and Toronto; for example 6,000 and 118,610 housing units, respectively, have been approved but not built. Oakville Mayor Rob Burton commented to the CBC about developers in late March 2017 that "we've given them serviced land they're sitting on." Toronto's Chief Planner Jennifer Keesmaat added that "builders control supply in this region. We live in a cartel economy."

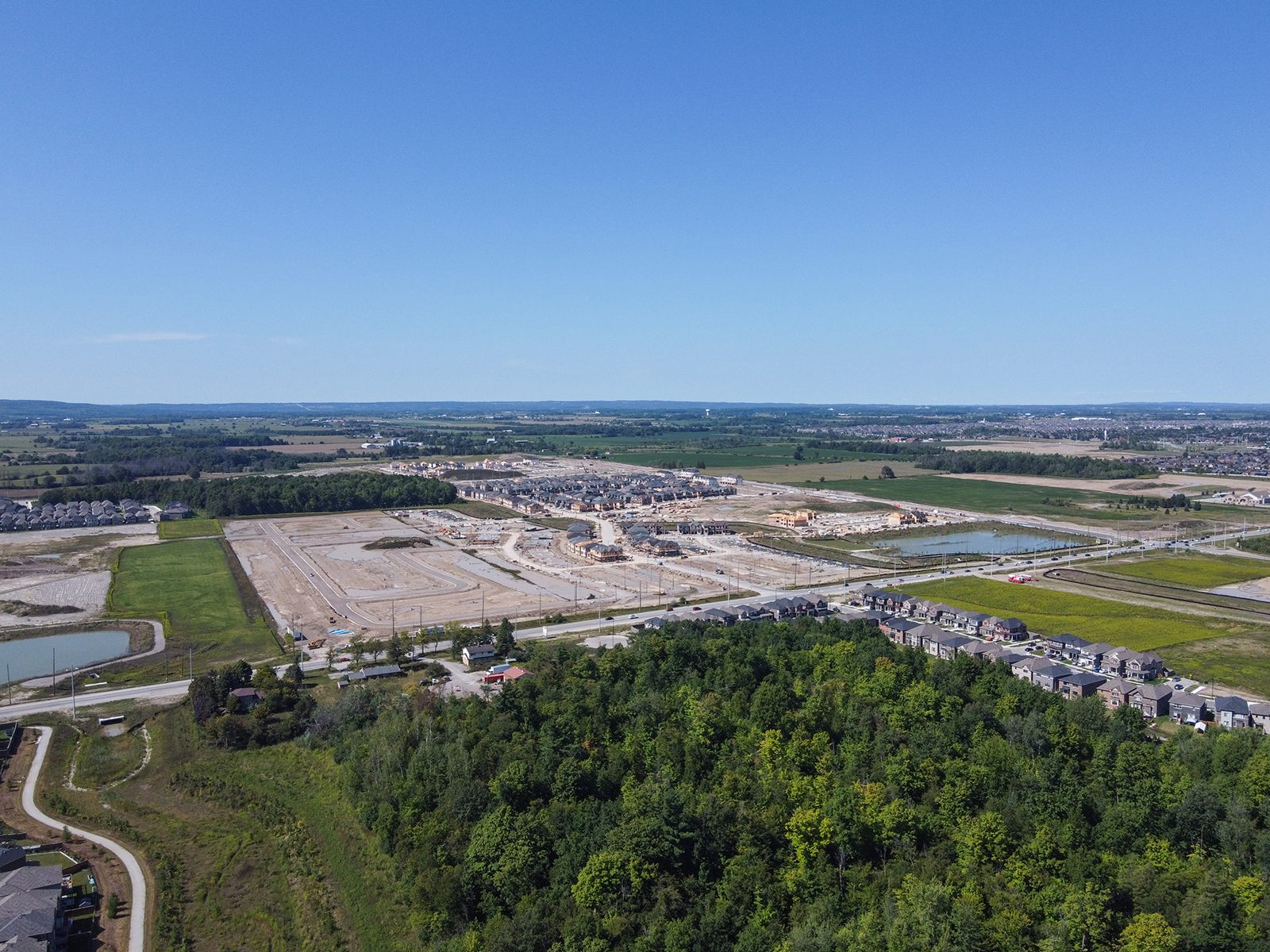
Some of the Greenbelt in Caledon became new housing in 2022

In late April 2018, during the 2018 Ontario general election campaign, Doug Ford, leader of the Ontario Progressive Conservative Party discussed the Greenbelt in a video released to the news media. Ford said that he would open the protected area to development if he was elected. His assurance to developers was made on the claim that the cost of new homes in the GTA and Hamilton area could be reduced if additional land were made available. Tim Gray, executive director of the environmentalist group Environmental Defence, reminded the news media that "municipal data shows that there is enough land available to provide for housing development within existing Greater Toronto and Hamilton Area urban boundaries until 2031." The next day, Ford reversed his position and said he would not develop the protected area.

=== Greenbelt scandal ===
After re-election in 2022, and amidst a worsening housing and affordability crisis, Premier Doug Ford became embroiled in controversy over properties released from Greenbelt protection. One developer had purchased property shortly before the decision was made. A total of 7,400 acres (3,000 ha; 30 km^{2}) of Greenbelt land was removed, while 9,400 acres (3,800 ha; 38 km^{2}) of land was added.

On August 9, 2023, the Auditor General released a report on the Greenbelt swap-out which found the government's flawed process had favoured certain developers who stood to earn over $8 billion. The AG also confirmed that alterations to the Greenbelt were not necessary to reach Ontario's housing target and that Housing Minister Steve Clark's chief of staff "failed to consider environmental, agricultural and financial risks and impacts". Calls from the opposition for Clark to resign were resisted by Ford and Clark himself, but Clark's chief of staff stepped down. At the end of August, Ontario's Integrity Commissioner found Clark had broken ethics rules, and on September 4, Clark tendered his resignation and was replaced by Paul Calandra. The following day, Ford reiterated he would follow 14 of the Auditor General's 15 recommendations but would proceed with allowing the construction of affordable homes under $500,000 for "newcomers and young people" on the Greenbelt. He also stated more applications to remove land from the Greenbelt would be reviewed. He did not answer a reporter's question about reinstating Rent Control, nor did he comment on calls from First Nation Chiefs across Ontario to return traditional territories to the Greenbelt.

On September 20, another minister from Ford's cabinet, Kaleed Rasheed, resigned over his relationship with a developer involved in the Greenbelt land swap. The next day, Ford announced that after continuous backlash from constituents and two reports regarding the flawed process of opening the Greenbelt he would reverse his decision to open the Greenbelt to development. He apologized to the people of Ontario and promised to encourage building within urban boundaries.

On October 16, Minister Calandra tabled a bill that would restore the Greenbelt lands removed in 2022 and that any future changes to the Greenbelt would have to go through the legislature. On December 6, 2023, Bill 136 received royal assent.

== Purpose and composition ==
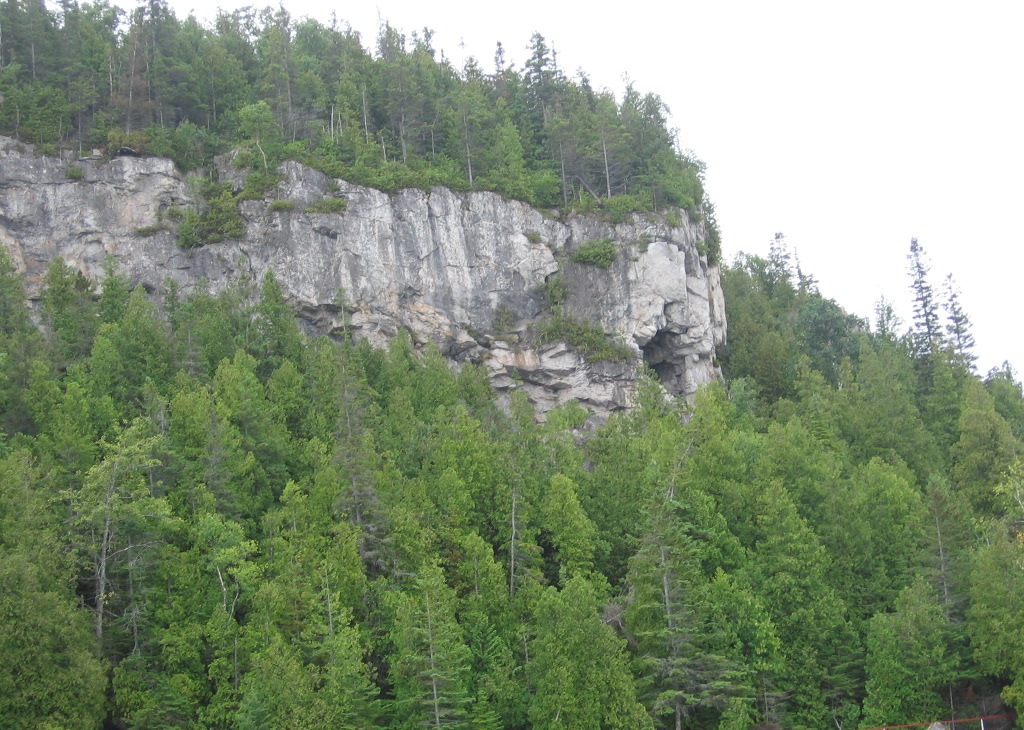
The escarpment at the Fathom Five National Marine Park.

The Greenbelt provides regulatory protection from urban development pressure due to this population growth. While protecting prime agricultural land is its primary purpose, it is actually a bundle of other key elements to also protect rural area, heritage sites, and sensitive ecological and hydrological features, which include the Niagara Escarpment and the Oak Ridges Moraine.

=== Protected Countryside ===
Agriculture protection is the primary element of the Greenbelt legislation. It prevents municipalities from re-zoning areas identified as "prime agricultural areas," "specialty crop areas," and "rural areas" identified by the province for other uses. The three areas compile the Protected Countryside (PC) element. The PC includes areas like the Holland Marsh, which produces over $50 million of carrots, onions and other popular vegetables in very fertile soil. Other fruits and vegetables, dairy, beef, pork, poultry, and wine grapes are produced throughout the region.

=== Niagara Escarpment ===
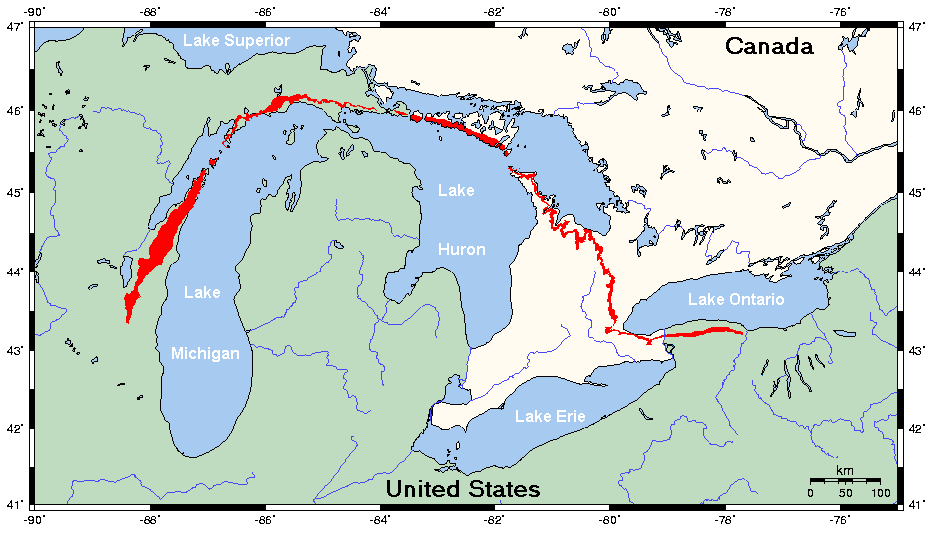
Niagara Escarpment (in red)

The Niagara Escarpment Biosphere Reserve is a geological formation reaching 725 kilometres long and up to 500 metres tall. It began as coastline of the Michigan Basin 450 million years ago. It was designated as one of 15 UNESCO World Biosphere Reserves in Canada in 1990. It is managed jointly by Ministry of Natural Resources and the Niagara Escarpment Commission. The area is protected due to the many unique species and prime recreation grounds. Tourism associated with the escarpment contributes $100 million to local and regional economies.

=== Oak Ridges Moraine ===
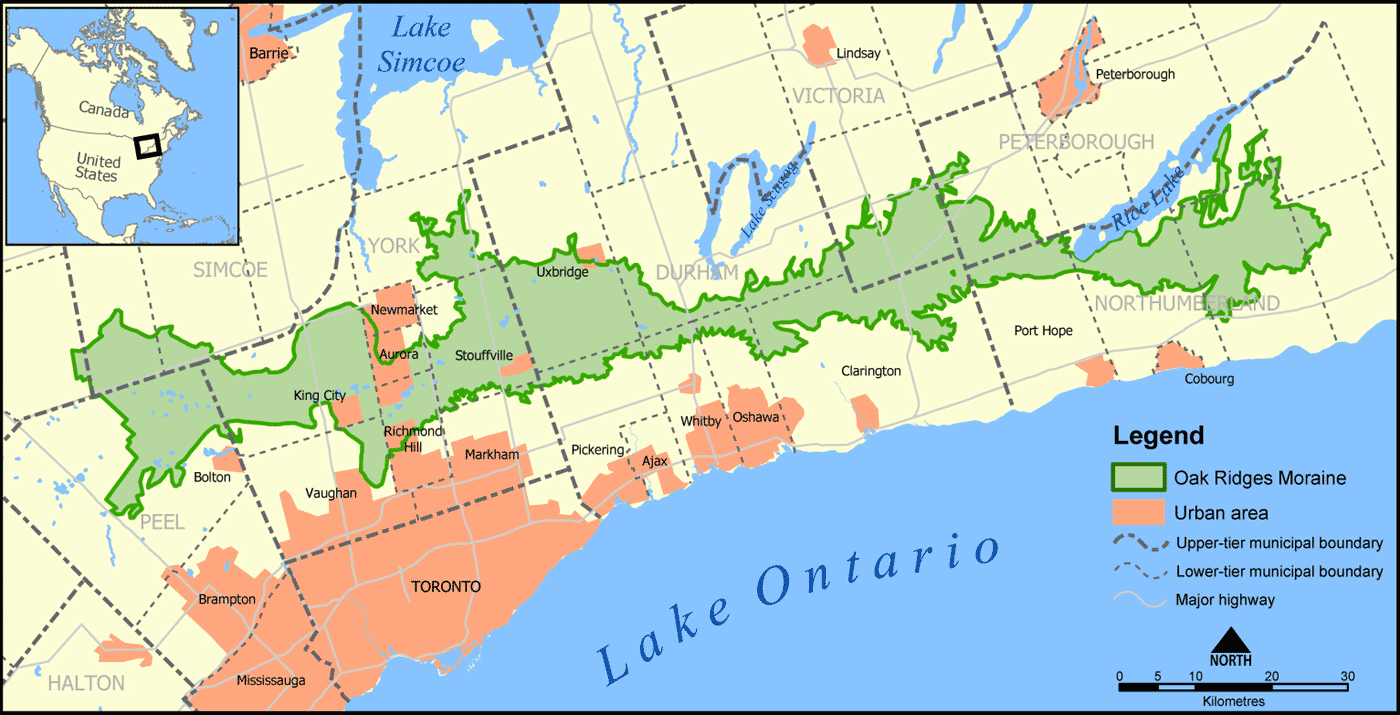
The Oak Ridges Moraine.

The Oak Ridges Moraine covers 1,900 square kilometres (730 sq mi) between Caledon and Rice Lake, near Peterborough. It is a hydrological system of streams, wetlands, kettle lakes and ponds and their catchment areas, seepage areas, springs, and aquifers and other recharge areas.

== Conservation ==
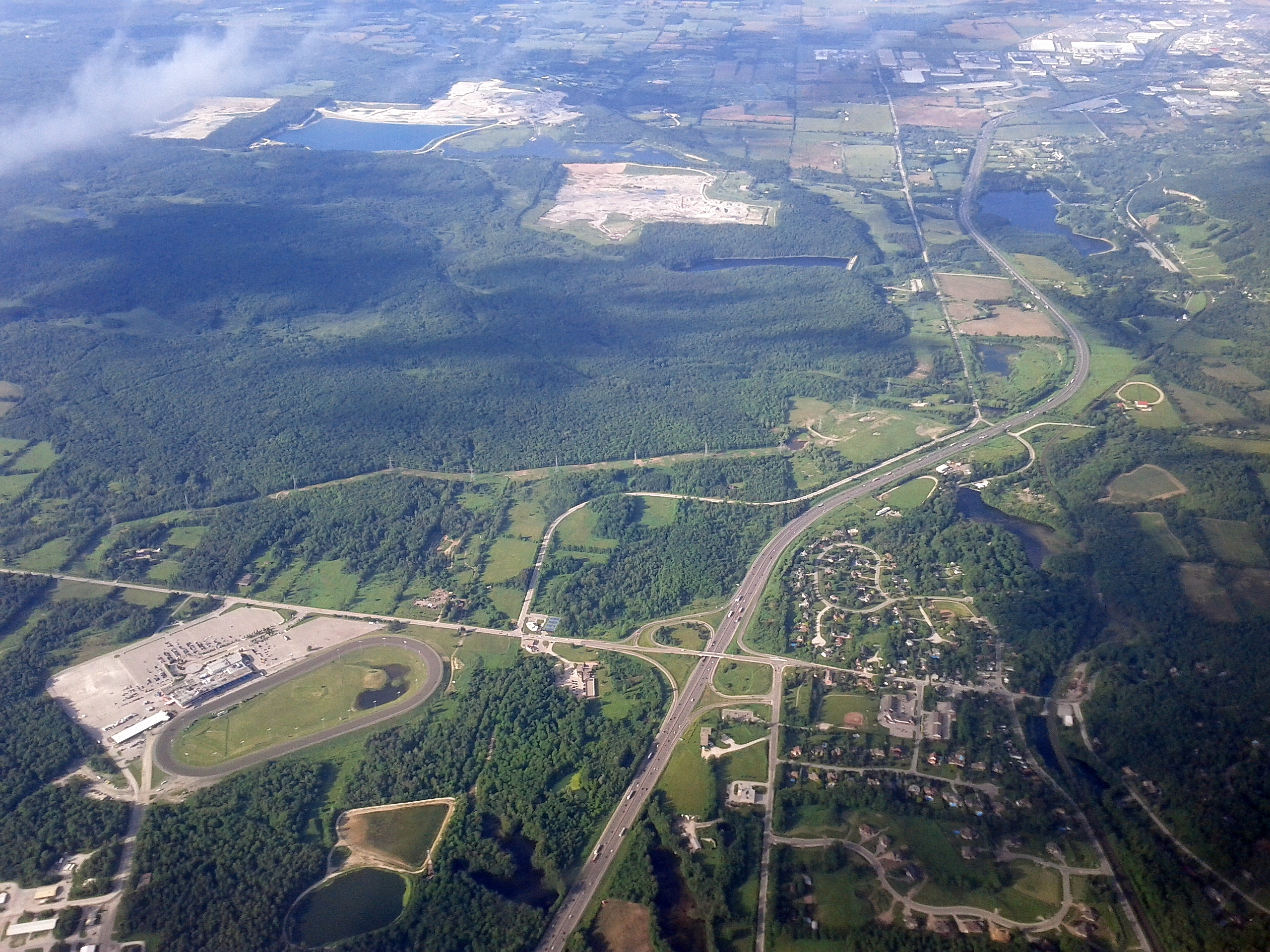
Highway 401 in the Greenbelt.

The Friends of the Greenbelt Foundation not-for-profit organization was created in 2005 to help foster the Greenbelt in Southern Ontario. The foundation, was provided $25 million from the provincial government, and funded many organizations and charities in the Greenbelt, which support agricultural and viticultural activities and restoring the natural environment.

The Foundation is also responsible for providing a "Friend of the Greenbelt" award that serves to "recognize and celebrate those individuals who make a significant contribution to Ontario's Greenbelt." In 2006, singer Sarah Harmer was selected by the Foundation for her "I love the Escarpment" tour, which aims to protect the Niagara Escarpment. In 2007, former Premier William Grenville Davis was presented with the award for adopting the 1973 Niagara Escarpment Planning and Development Act, which created the Niagara Escarpment Plan.

A report titled Ontario’s Greenbelt in an International Context was released in 2010 by the Canadian Institute for Environmental Law and Policy. The report concluded the Ontario greenbelt is the strongest among nine similar greenbelts internationally due to its supporting legislation and degree of political commitment.

A report titled GTHA Rural Property Inequities was released in 2015 in the Township of Scugog. This report concluded the Ontario greenbelt has many issues to overcome before it is a viable and sustainable proposition. It also concludes many of the supporters of the greenbelt are from metropolitan areas and don't contribute monetarily to its welfare.

== See also ==
- Greenbelt scandal
- National Capital Greenbelt – A greenbelt surrounding Ottawa overseen by the National Capital Commission
- Politics of the Oak Ridges Moraine
- Rouge Park
- Agricultural Land Reserve
- Niagara Escarpment Biosphere Reserve
- Loi sur la protection du territoire et des activités agricoles – Similar agricultural protection law in Southern Quebec.
