= Golden Horseshoe =

- Secondary region
- From top to bottom, left to right: Thorold, Scugog, Ajax, Hamilton

- Location of the Golden Horseshoe in Ontario. ██ Core area ██ Greater Golden Horseshoe
- Coordinates: 43.6°N 79.73°W
- Country: Canada
- Province: Ontario
- Largest metro: Greater Toronto Area

Area
  - Total: 31,561.57 km^{2} (12,185.99 sq mi)
  - Core area: 10,097.45 km^{2} (3,898.65 sq mi)
  - Extended area: 21,464.12 km^{2} (8,287.34 sq mi)

Population (2021)
  - Total: 9,765,188
  - Estimate (2025): 11,198,136
  - Core area: 7,759,635
  - Extended area: 2,005,553

GDP (Nominal, 2022)
  - Total: $656.36 billion
  - Core area: $586.83 billion
  - Extended area: $69.53 billion
- Time zone: UTC−05:00 (EST)
  - Summer (DST): UTC−04:00 (EDT)
- Postal code prefixes: K, L, M, N
- Area codes: 226, 249, 289, 365, 416, 437, 519, 548, 647, 705, 905

The Golden Horseshoe (French: Fer à cheval doré) is a secondary region of Southern Ontario, Canada, which lies at the western end of Lake Ontario, with outer boundaries stretching south to Lake Erie and north to Lake Scugog, Lake Simcoe and Georgian Bay of Lake Huron. The region is the most densely populated and industrialized in Canada. Based on the 2021 census, with a population of 7,759,635 people in its core and 9,765,188 in its greater area, the Golden Horseshoe accounts for over 20 percent of the population of Canada and more than 54 percent of Ontario's population. The population of the greater area is estimated to have surpassed 11,000,000 people since 2024. The Golden Horseshoe is part of the Quebec City–Windsor Corridor, itself part of the Great Lakes megalopolis.

The core of the Golden Horseshoe starts from Niagara Falls at the eastern end of the Niagara Peninsula bordering the United States via New York state and extends west, wrapping around the western end of Lake Ontario at Hamilton and then turning northeast to Toronto (on the northwestern shore of Lake Ontario), before finally terminating at Clarington in Durham Region. The term Greater Golden Horseshoe is used to describe a broader region that stretches inland from the core to the area of the Trent–Severn Waterway, such as Peterborough, in the northeast, to Barrie and Lake Simcoe in the north, and to the Grand River area, which includes cities such as Brantford and Guelph, to the west. The extended region's area covers approximately 33,500 square kilometres (13,000 square miles), out of this, 7,300 km^{2} (2,800 sq mi) or approximately 22 percent of the area is covered by the environmentally protected Greenbelt. The Greater Golden Horseshoe forms the neck of the Ontario Peninsula.

== Etymology ==
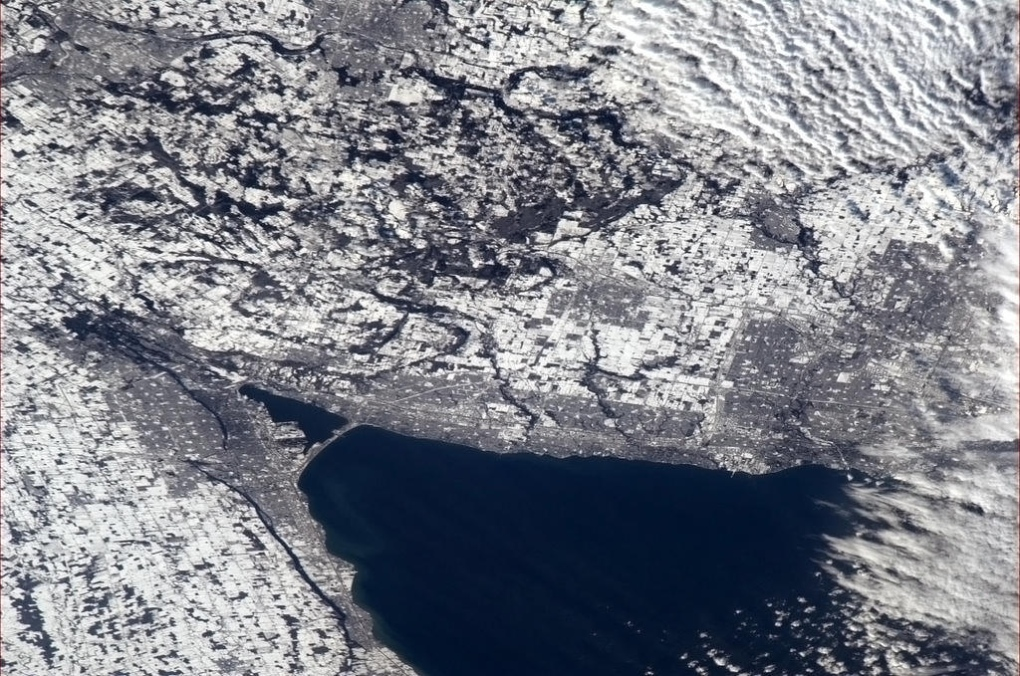
The western end of Lake Ontario during the winter. The region takes its name from the horseshoe shape.

The horseshoe part of the region's name is derived from the characteristic horseshoe shape of the west end of Lake Ontario. The golden part is historically attributed to the region's wealth and prosperity, according to the Canadian Oxford Dictionary.

The phrase Golden Horseshoe was first used by Westinghouse Electric Corporation president Herbert H. Rogge in a speech to the Hamilton Chamber of Commerce on January 12, 1954:

Hamilton in 50 years will be the forward cleat in a "golden horseshoe" of industrial development from Oshawa to the Niagara River ... 150 miles [240 km] long and 50 miles [80 km] wide ... It will run from Niagara Falls on the south to about Oshawa on the north and take in numerous cities and towns already there, including Hamilton and Toronto.

The speech writer who actually penned the phrase was Charles Hunter MacBain, executive assistant to five Westinghouse presidents including Rogge.

== Definition ==
Upper- and single-tier municipalities located within the Greater Golden Horseshoe

The Golden Horseshoe was officialized on July 13, 2004, in a report from the provincial Ministry of Public Infrastructure Renewal titled Places to Grow, in which the region's borders extended west to Waterloo Region, north to Barrie / Simcoe County, and northeast to the county and city of Peterborough. A subsequent edition released on February 16, 2005, broadened the term further, adding Brant, Haldimand and Northumberland Counties to the region. The Greater Golden Horseshoe region is officially designated in Ontario Regulation 416/05 under the Places to Grow Act. The designation Greater Golden Horseshoe has legal significance with respect to taxation: in April 2017, the Government of Ontario announced plans to impose a 15 per cent Non-Resident Speculation Tax (NRST) on non-Canadian citizens, non-permanent residents and non-Canadian corporations (with exceptions or rebates for refugees, qualifying students and certain people working in Ontario) buying residential properties containing one to six units in the Greater Golden Horseshoe (GGH).

The provincial transit authority Metrolinx makes use of the term "Greater Golden Horseshoe". The Metrolinx definition is consistent with the original 2004 Places to Grow definition. However, the city and county of Peterborough is not included.

== Demographics ==
=== Population ===
Core region (Note: Combined population of Toronto, Peel Region, York Region, Durham Region, Halton Region, Hamilton, and Niagara Region.) population history
Year	Pop.	±%
2001	5,982,668	—
2006	6,487,892	+8.4%
2011	7,005,491	+8.0%
2016	7,402,321	+5.7%
2021	7,759,635	+4.8%
Source: Statistics Canada

Section	Census division	2025 Population Estimate	2024 Population Estimate	2021 Population Census	Area (km^{2})	Population Density (/km^{2}) in 2021
Core	Durham Region	810,075	792,615	696,992	2,524	276
Core	Halton Region	666,454	656,926	596,637	964	619
Core	Hamilton	640,465	632,111	569,353	1,118	509
Core	Niagara Region	551,128	539,180	477,941	1,854	258
Core	Peel Region	1,632,557	1,662,864	1,451,022	1,247	1,164
Core	Toronto	3,271,830	3,273,119	2,794,356	630	4,434
Core	York Region	1,299,177	1,285,154	1,173,334	1,758	667
Core	Total core	8,871,686	8,841,969	7,759,635	10,096	769
Extended	Brant (County of Brant and Brantford)	177,094	174,324	144,771	916	158
Extended	Dufferin County	73,810	72,358	66,257	1,486	45
Extended	Haldimand-Norfolk County	133,027	130,217	116,872	1,250	93
Extended	Kawartha Lakes	85,351	84,988	79,247	3,084	26
Extended	Northumberland County	96,779	96,257	89,365	1,905	47
Extended	Peterborough (Peterborough County and the city of Peterborough)	169,985	167,979	147,681	3,834	39
Extended	Simcoe (Simcoe County, Barrie and Orillia)	611,297	598,785	533,169	4,946	108
Extended	Waterloo Region	711,457	706,875	587,165	1,369	429
Extended	Wellington (Wellington County and Guelph)	267,650	265,513	241,026	2,753	88
Extended	Total extended	2,326,450	2,297,296	2,005,553	21,545	93
Total	all	11,198,136	11,139,265	9,765,188	31,640	309

=== Ethnicity ===
The Golden Horseshoe is among the most multicultural regions in Canada.

In 2021, there were 3,762,090 people of European heritage, forming a plurality of the population (49.0%); the next largest groups were those of South Asian descent (1,273,525 people or 16.6%) and those of East Asian heritage (813,015 people or 10.6%)

Panethnic groups in the Golden Horseshoe Core Region (2001−2021)
Panethnic group	2021		2016		2011		2006		2001	
Panethnic group	Pop.	%	Pop.	%	Pop.	%	Pop.	%	Pop.	%
European (Note: Statistic includes all persons that did not make up part of a visible minority or an indigenous identity.)	3,762,090	49%	3,998,525	54.69%	4,093,475	59.16%	4,069,110	63.28%	4,085,430	68.87%
South Asian	1,273,525	16.59%	1,023,140	13.99%	868,125	12.55%	712,975	11.09%	494,850	8.34%
East Asian (Note: Statistic includes total responses of "Chinese", "Korean", and "Japanese" under visible minority section on census.)	813,015	10.59%	754,190	10.31%	638,740	9.23%	585,980	9.11%	488,990	8.24%
Black	563,330	7.34%	493,510	6.75%	435,750	6.3%	385,400	5.99%	333,540	5.62%
Southeast Asian (Note: Statistic includes total responses of "Filipino" and "Southeast Asian" under visible minority section on census.)	424,690	5.53%	366,470	5.01%	345,015	4.99%	260,385	4.05%	200,375	3.38%
Middle Eastern (Note: Statistic includes total responses of "West Asian" and "Arab" under visible minority section on census.)	327,375	4.26%	254,730	3.48%	189,875	2.74%	143,570	2.23%	105,040	1.77%
Latin American	179,580	2.34%	149,995	2.05%	131,925	1.91%	111,560	1.74%	83,195	1.4%
Indigenous	82,395	1.07%	80,475	1.1%	63,200	0.91%	46,465	0.72%	35,405	0.6%
Other/Multiracial (Note: Statistic includes total responses of "Visible minority, n.i.e." and "Multiple visible minorities" under visible minority section on census.)	251,470	3.28%	190,805	2.61%	152,685	2.21%	114,365	1.78%	105,490	1.78%
Total responses	7,677,470	98.94%	7,311,815	98.78%	6,918,750	98.76%	6,429,855	99.11%	5,932,330	99.16%
Total population	7,759,635	100%	7,402,321	100%	7,005,491	100%	6,487,892	100%	5,982,668	100%
Note: Totals greater than 100% due to multiple origin responses 2021 census sources: 2016 census sources: 2011 census sources: 2006 census sources: 2001 census sources:

== Economy ==
The economy of this region is very diverse. As of 2007, the Toronto Stock Exchange is the third-largest in North America by market capitalization (after the New York Stock Exchange and Nasdaq), and ranks among the 10 largest stock exchanges in the world.

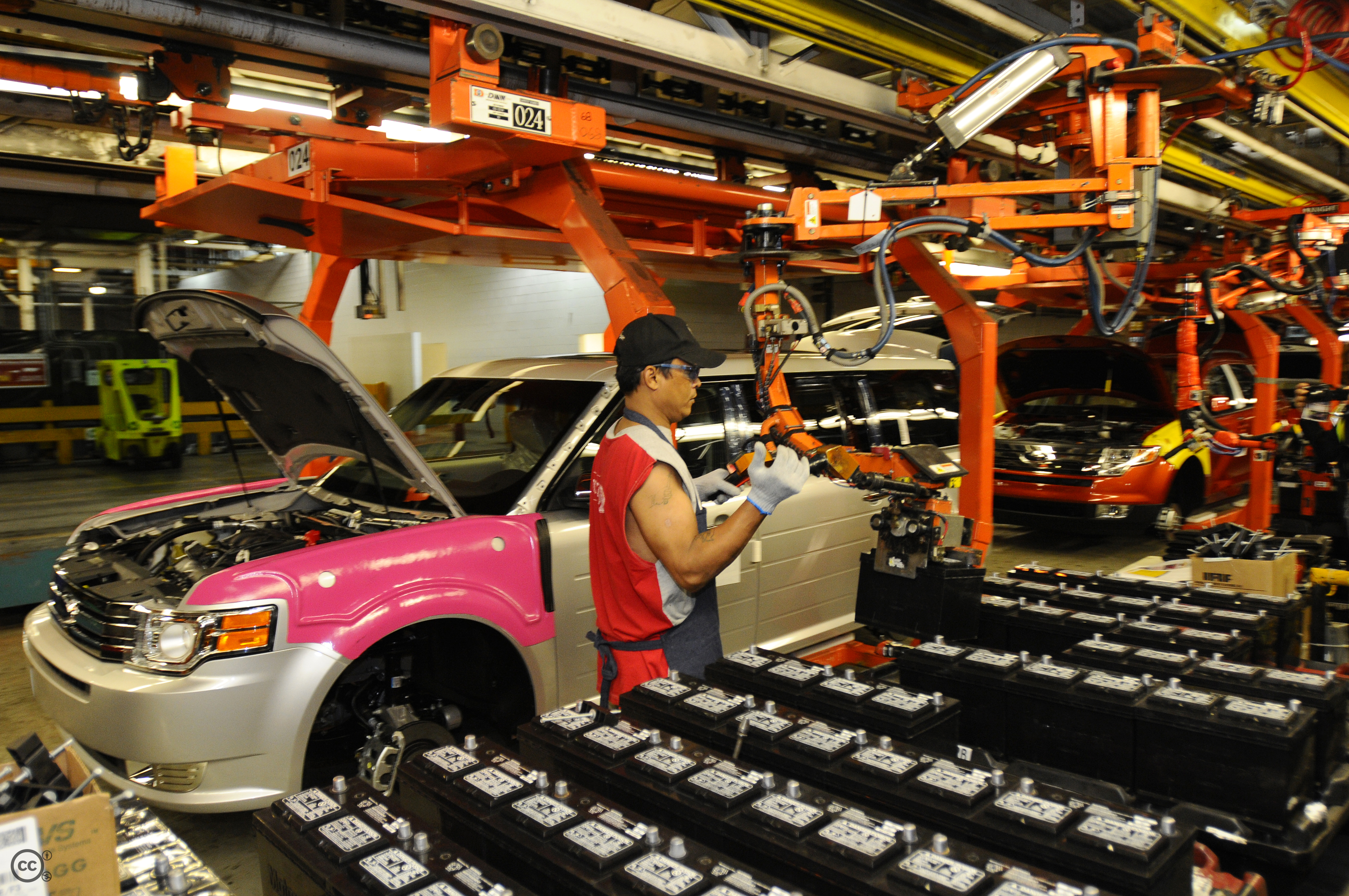
A worker installing car batteries at Ford's Oakville Assembly. The automotive industry is a major sector of the Golden Horseshoe's economy.

Cities including Hamilton, Oshawa, Oakville, Whitby and Kitchener all contain major large-scale industrial production facilities, Hamilton being dominated by the steel industry and Oakville and Oshawa primarily in the automotive industry. Other significant automotive-production facilities also exist in Brampton and St. Catharines. While manufacturing remains important to the economy of the region, the manufacturing sector has experienced a significant decline since 2000 as a result of unfavourable currency exchange rates, increasing energy costs, and reduced demand from the United States, which is by far the largest market for Ontario's goods.

The Port of Hamilton and the Port of Toronto are the two largest inland ports on Lake Ontario. The Welland Canal system handles tanker ships and recreational traffic through the Great Lakes. Large rail and truck distribution facilities are located in Toronto, Vaughan and Brampton. Food processing is also a key ingredient in the economy.

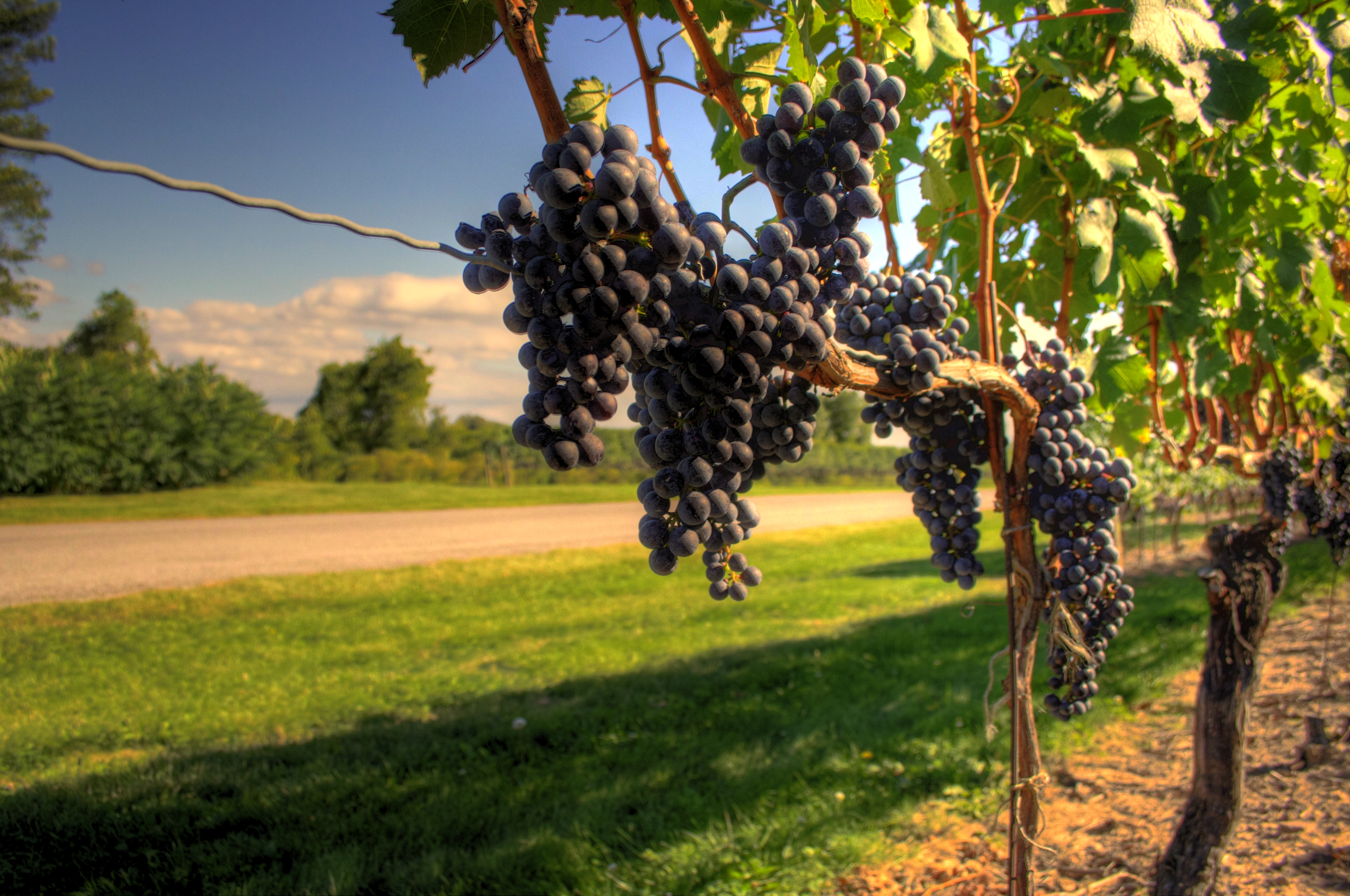
The Niagara Peninsula is Canada's largest wine-growing region and a major producer of Ontario wine.

Niagara Falls has one of the world's largest per-capita tourist economies, benefiting from millions of tourists coming to see its waterfalls, shop in its numerous stores, and visit its many attractions. The winemaking and fruit-growing industries of the Niagara Peninsula produce wines, in particular, the ice wine for which the region is known.

As of 2014, sectors such as information technology, health care, Agtech, tourism, research and finance provide the bulk of growth in the Golden Horseshoe. The cities of Brampton, Markham, Waterloo Region and Mississauga are emerging as hubs for technology and innovation. The region is one of the largest tech cluster in North America outside of Silicon Valley. The area is home to more than 15,000 tech companies, including over 5,000 startups, and nearly 300,000 employees in high-tech industries. About two-thirds of those employees are classified as “tech workers,” which includes programmers, developers, etc. with 8 percent of the total workforce employed in tech.

== Education ==
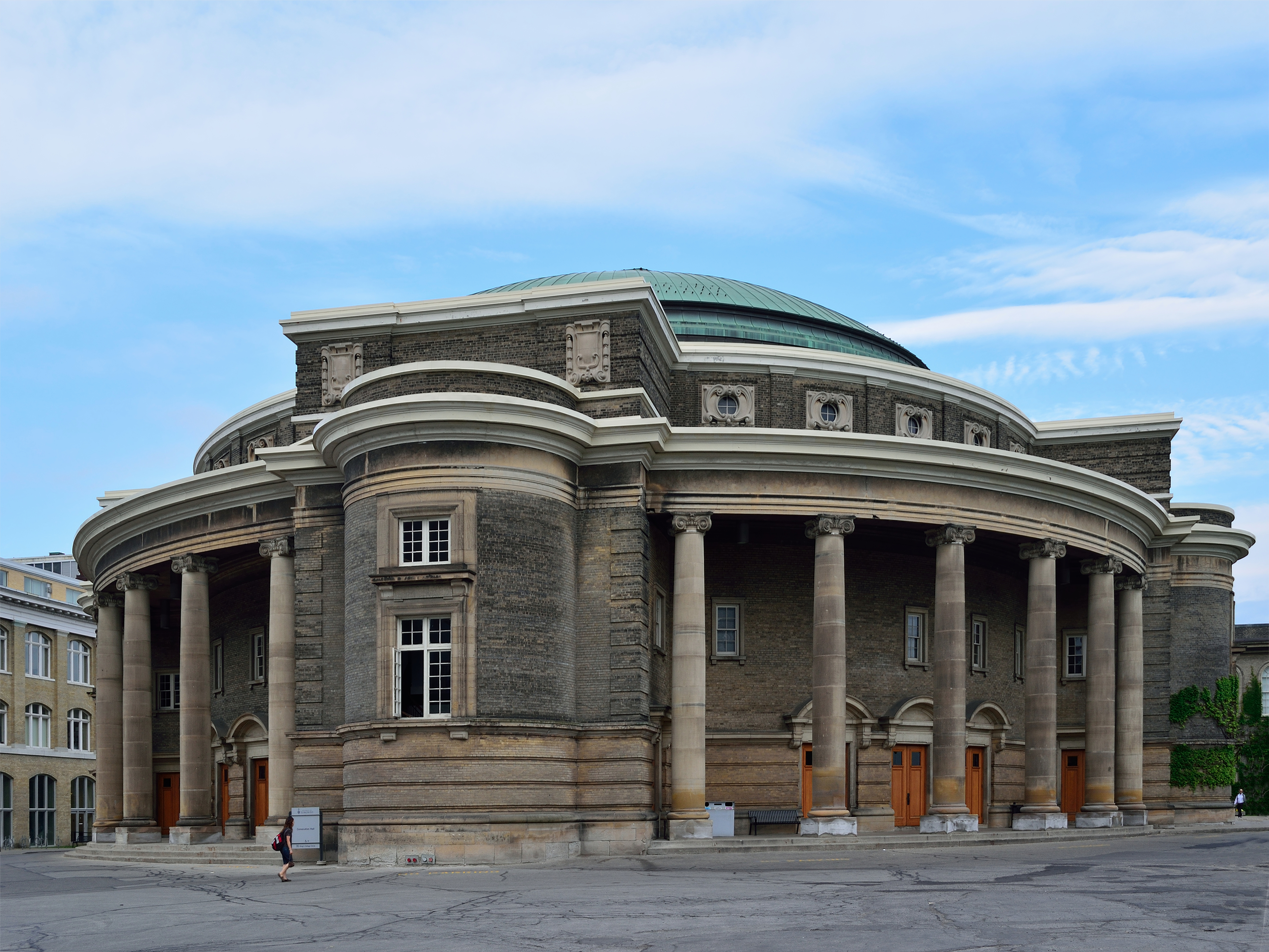
Convocation Hall in the University of Toronto

The Golden Horseshoe is home to several universities, including the University of Toronto and McMaster University in Hamilton, which are ranked 1st and 4th in Canada, respectively, by the Academic Ranking of World Universities, with the University of Toronto placing 26th globally in the 2024 edition. Other universities in the region include Brock University in St. Catharines, Trent University in Peterborough, York University in northern Toronto near Vaughan, OCAD University in downtown Toronto, Ontario Tech University in Oshawa, Toronto Metropolitan University (formerly Ryerson University), the University of Guelph, the University of Waterloo, Wilfrid Laurier University in Waterloo, and the Université de l'Ontario français in downtown Toronto. The Golden Horseshoe is also home to many colleges.

Public primary and secondary schooling is typically provided by school boards, largely organized at the municipal or county/regional level. The only school boards that operate throughout the Golden Horseshoe are Conseil scolaire Viamonde, a public French-language school board, and Conseil scolaire catholique MonAvenir, a public French-language separate school board. Both of these public French-language school boards operate across the Ontario Peninsula.

== Attractions ==
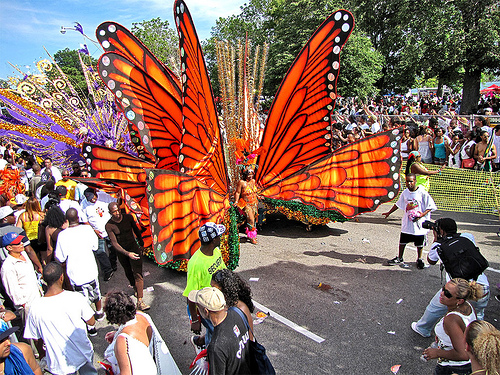
Toronto Caribbean Carnival, also known as Caribana, is an annual cultural festival held in the City of Toronto.

The CN Tower in downtown Toronto is among the most internationally notable attractions in the Golden Horseshoe. Other major attractions in downtown Toronto include the Royal Ontario Museum, the Art Gallery of Ontario, Ripley's Aquarium, and the Hockey Hall of Fame.

The region is home to several shopping malls such as Yorkdale Shopping Centre, Toronto Eaton Centre, Fairview Mall, Scarborough Town Centre, and Sherway Gardens. Located in the suburbs of Toronto are Vaughan Mills in Vaughan, Bramalea City Centre in Brampton, Square One Shopping Centre in Mississauga, and Pacific Mall and Markville Shopping Centre in Markham.

Annual cultural festivals that draw tourists and locals alike include the Toronto Caribbean Carnival (formerly known as Caribana) and Taste of the Danforth in Toronto.

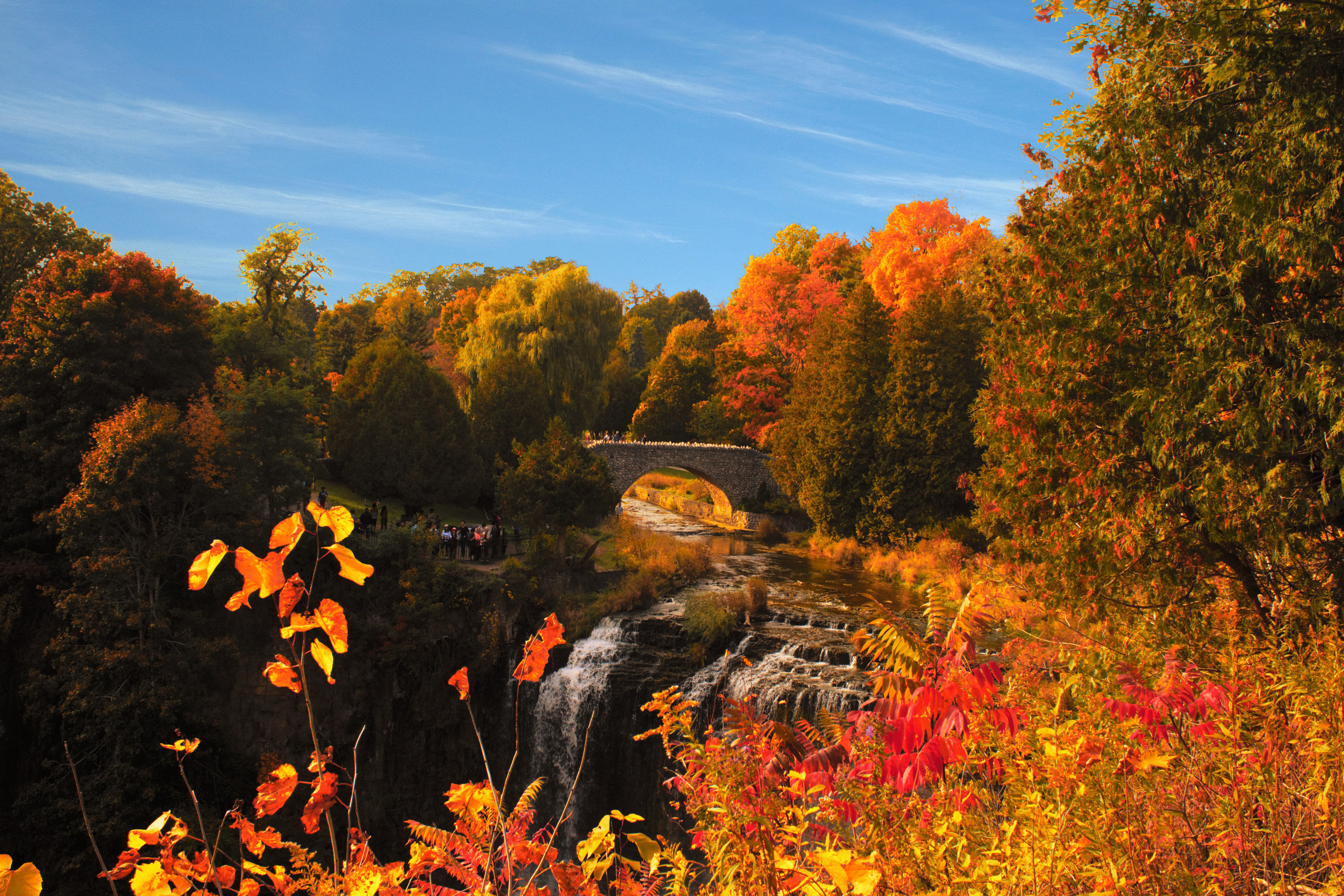
View of Webster's Falls in Hamilton. The falls is a part of the Niagara Escarpment Biosphere Reserve, which runs across the western portion of the Golden Horseshoe.

The Niagara Escarpment, a world biosphere reserve as designated by the United Nations, runs from the north at the tip of Bruce Peninsula and then east through the region cutting the Niagara Gorge at Niagara Falls. The Bruce Trail runs along the escarpment through mostly protected woodlands. The Cheltenham Badlands in Caledon is an environmentally degraded area along the Niagara Escarpment. Similar protection of some wooded areas exists on the Oak Ridges Moraine running east–west in the north end of the Greater Toronto Area, although development pressures continue to threaten the natural habitat.

The Niagara Region has become one of the major wine-production areas in Canada. The Golden Horseshoe contains many small towns with historic main streets, most notably the community of Niagara-on-the-Lake, located near the Niagara River. Niagara Falls has one of the world's largest waterfalls and attracts millions to Clifton Hill, a neighbourhood with souvenir stores, small attractions, restaurants and skyline-defining hotels. There are also two casinos: Casino Niagara and Niagara Fallsview Casino Resort.

Hamilton has the historical reputation of being a blue-collar city; however, waterfront redevelopments and large-scale gentrification have been rapidly changing the perception of the city, although it retains a dominant industrial base. Hamilton has over a hundred waterfalls and cascades throughout the region.

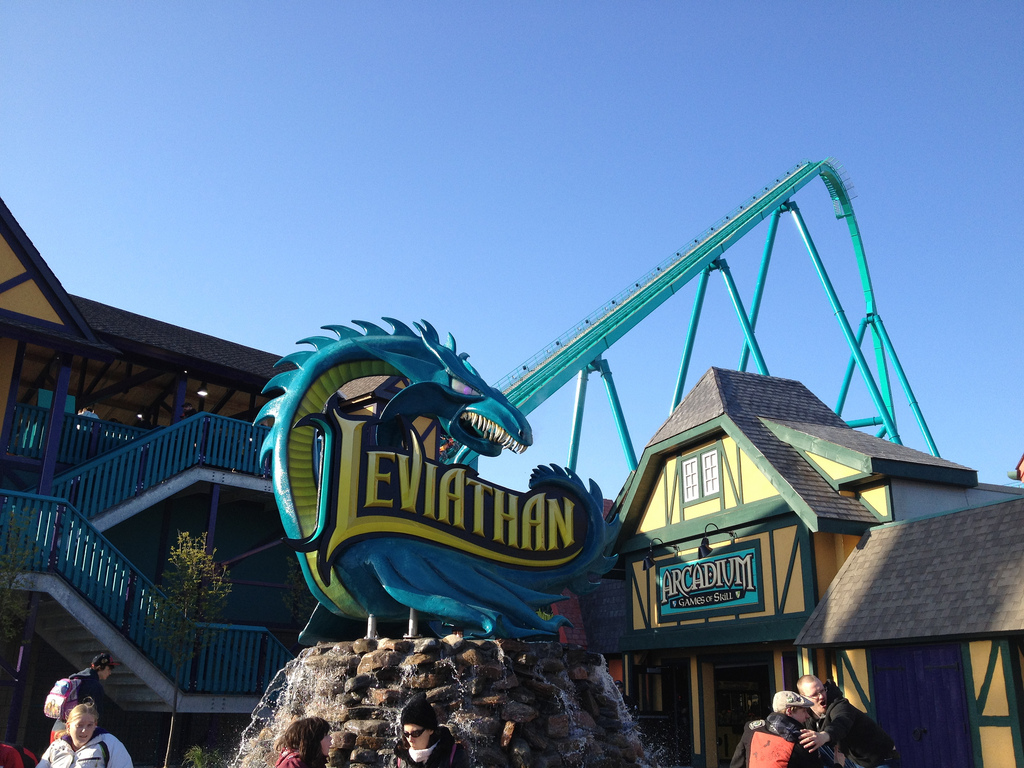
View of the Leviathan roller coaster at Canada's Wonderland in Vaughan; Canada's Wonderland is owned by Six Flags since the merger of the park's former owner Cedar Fair and Six Flags in 2024

Seasonal amusement parks and large outdoor attractions in the Golden Horseshoe include Canada's Wonderland, run by Six Flags, in Vaughan; Wet'n'Wild Toronto (formerly Wild Water Kingdom) in Brampton; African Lion Safari in Hamilton and Cambridge; and the defunct Marineland in Niagara Falls. Though technically a provincial fair, the Exhibition Place just west of downtown Toronto hosts the annual Canadian National Exhibition, while the nearby Ontario Place is being redeveloped.

=== Sports ===
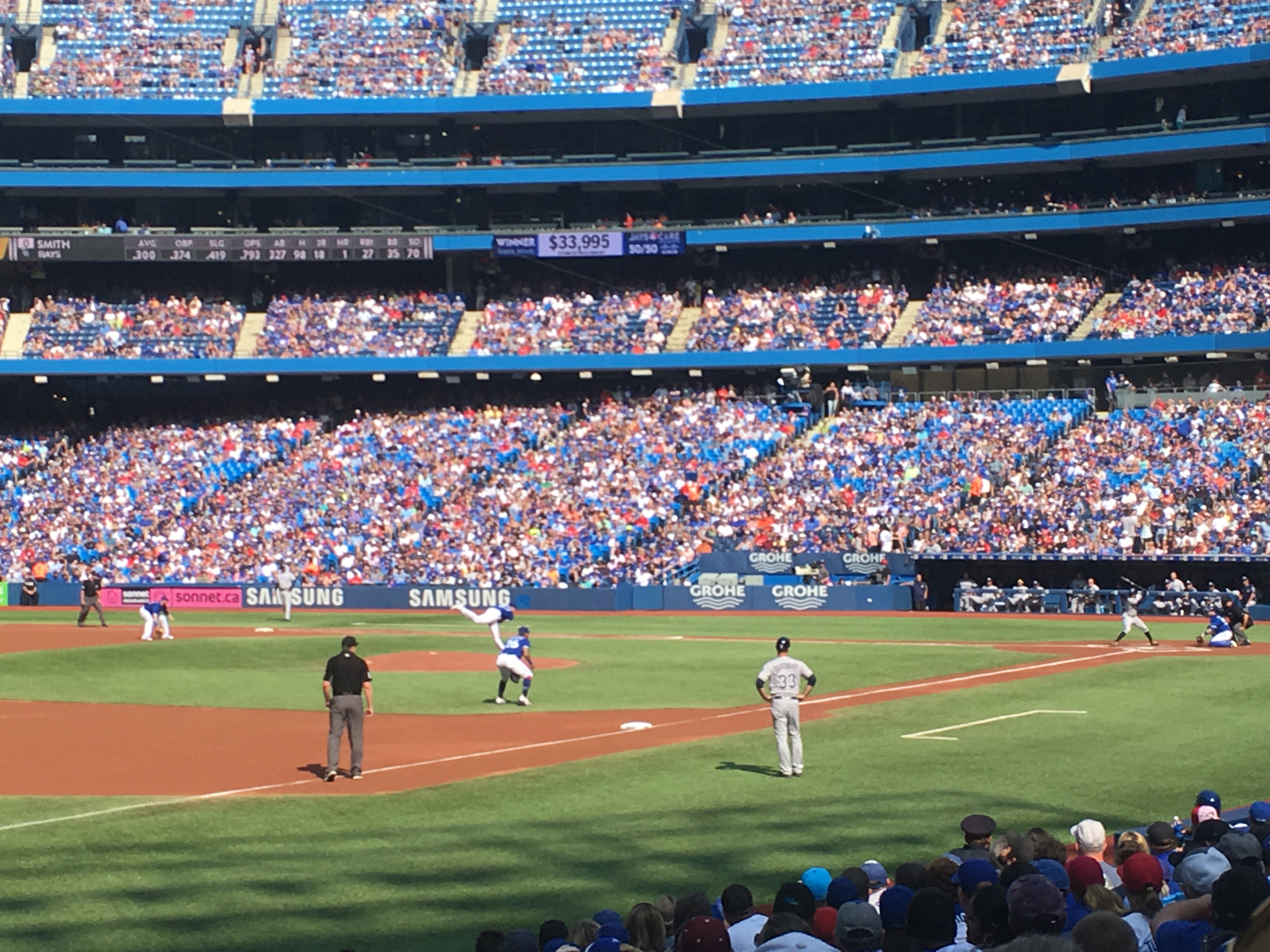
A Toronto Blue Jays game at the Rogers Centre in 2018

The Golden Horseshoe is home to many amateur and professional sports clubs, and university and college varsity programs. Many professional sports clubs in the city form a part of a larger sports league. Most university varsity programs are regulated by U Sports, while college varsity programs are regulated by the Canadian Collegiate Athletic Association.

In addition to the number of sports clubs and programs based in the region, the Golden Horseshoe has also hosted several international multi-sport events, including the 1930 British Empire Games (predecessor to the Commonwealth Games), the 1976 Summer Paralympics, the 2015 Pan American Games and Parapan American Games, the 2017 Invictus Games, the 2017 North American Indigenous Games, and the 2018 NACAC Championships. Although much of the 1976 Summer Olympics was held in Montreal, several matches for the event's soccer tournament were played in Toronto. Toronto is among various cities in North America that hosted select matches for the 2026 FIFA World Cup.

Professional sports teams based in the Golden Horseshoe:
Team	City	League	Sport
Toronto Blue Jays	Toronto	Major League Baseball	Baseball
Toronto Maple Leafs	Toronto	Canadian Baseball League	Baseball
Toronto Raptors	Toronto	National Basketball Association	Basketball
Raptors 905	Mississauga	NBA G League	Basketball
Toronto Tempo	Toronto	Women's National Basketball Association	Basketball
Brampton Honey Badgers	Brampton	Canadian Elite Basketball League	Basketball
Niagara River Lions	St. Catharines	Canadian Elite Basketball League	Basketball
Scarborough Shooting Stars	Toronto	Canadian Elite Basketball League	Basketball
Oshawa FireWolves	Oshawa	National Lacrosse League	Box lacrosse
Toronto Rock	Hamilton	National Lacrosse League	Box lacrosse
Hamilton Tiger-Cats	Hamilton	Canadian Football League	Canadian football
Toronto Argonauts	Toronto	Canadian Football League	Canadian football
Toronto Marlies	Toronto	American Hockey League	Ice hockey
Hamilton Hammers	Hamilton	American Hockey League	Ice hockey
Toronto Maple Leafs	Toronto	National Hockey League	Ice hockey
Toronto Sceptres	Toronto	Professional Women's Hockey League	Ice hockey
Hamilton Havoc	Hamilton	Professional Women's Hockey League	Ice hockey
Toronto FC	Toronto	Major League Soccer	Soccer
Toronto FC II	Toronto	MLS Next Pro	Soccer
Forge FC	Hamilton	Canadian Premier League	Soccer
Inter Toronto FC	Toronto	Canadian Premier League	Soccer
AFC Toronto	Toronto	Northern Super League	Soccer
Toronto MLC Team	Toronto	Major League Cricket	Twenty20 cricket
Toronto North	Toronto	World TeamTennis	Tennis

Note that the Toronto Blue Jays temporarily played their home games in the United States (more specifically Dunedin, Florida and Buffalo, New York) due to the COVID-19 pandemic in North America in 2020 and 2021, while the Toronto Raptors played their home games in the United States (more specifically Tampa, Florida) during the pandemic to minimize cross-border travel.

== Transportation ==
=== Expressways ===
The Queen Elizabeth Way is a major controlled-access highway that connects the Greater Toronto Area with the Niagara Peninsula.

The Golden Horseshoe is served by a network of expressways; central among these are the Queen Elizabeth Way and Highway 401, the latter of which is one of the widest and busiest expressways in the world.

=== Public transit ===
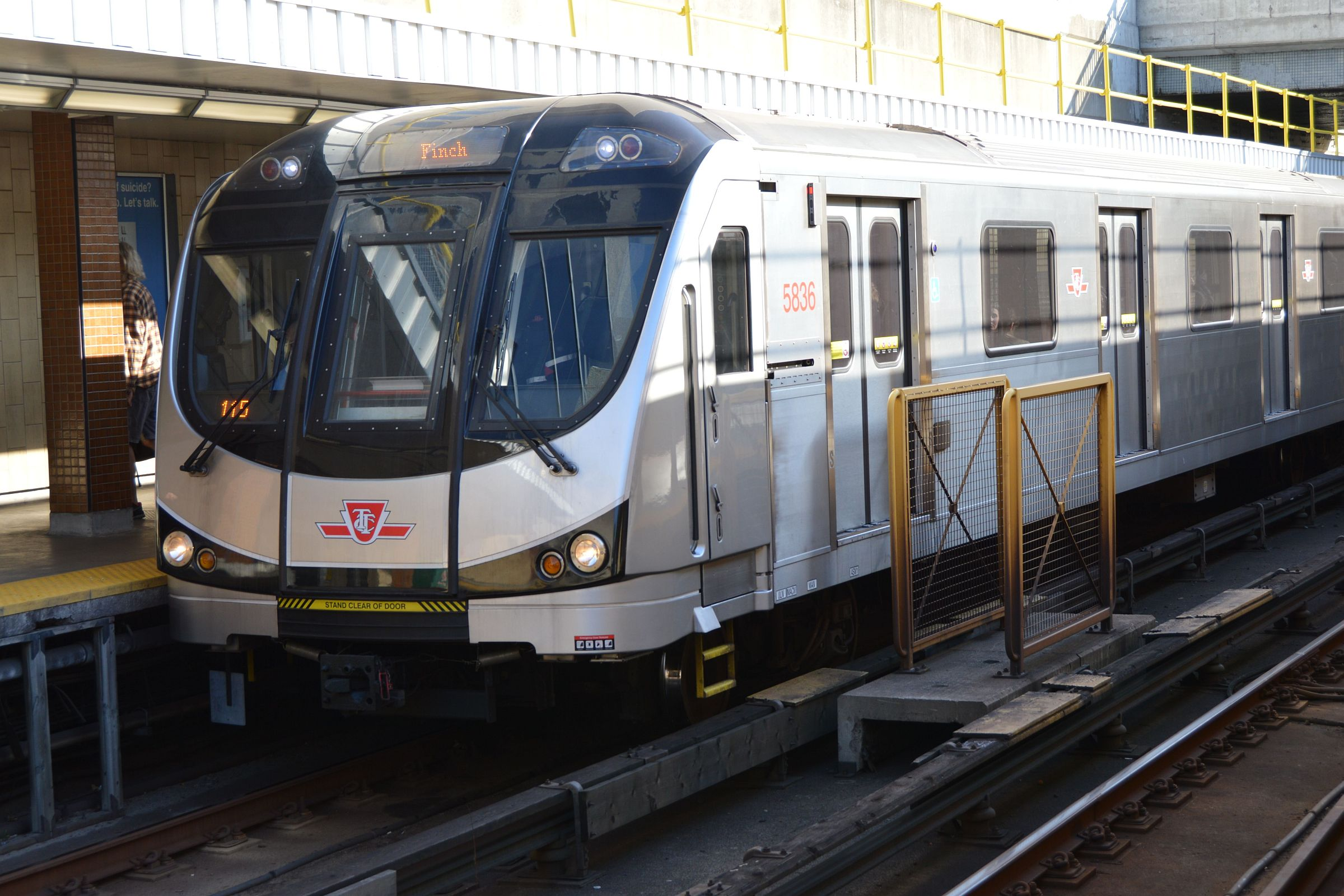
A Toronto Rocket train at the Toronto subway's Davisville station on Line 1 Yonge–University

Public transit in the region is coordinated by Metrolinx. Regional transit is provided by GO Transit trains and buses, and by intercity bus operators such as Ontario Northland and Coach Canada. GO Transit's train network encompasses seven commuter rail lines linking municipalities in the Golden Horseshoe to Toronto's Union Station, which is the busiest railway station in Canada and the second-busiest railway station in North America, with 72 million passengers per year. Expansion is underway to facilitate all-day 15-minute or better commuter train service, electrification and increased ridership on five of the busiest lines.

Local transit is provided by municipal agencies, the largest of which is the Toronto Transit Commission, which operates three subway lines, two LRT lines and one former light metro line and an extensive bus and streetcar network. Rapid transit systems that operate primarily outside Toronto include the VIVA bus rapid transit in York Region, the ION light rail system in Kitchener-Waterloo, and the Mississauga transitway. Line 5 is an LRT line in Toronto that is part of its subway system and opened on February 8, 2026. Line 6, another LRT line in the system, opened on December 7, 2025. The Ontario Line is another subway line under construction in Toronto, albeit using different technology. The Hurontario LRT (officially the Hazel McCallion Line, named after former Mississauga mayor Hazel McCallion) is under construction in Peel Region, with Metrolinx targeting completion of the initial route by spring 2028, as well as various other bus rapid transit projects in Peel and York Regions.

=== Airports ===
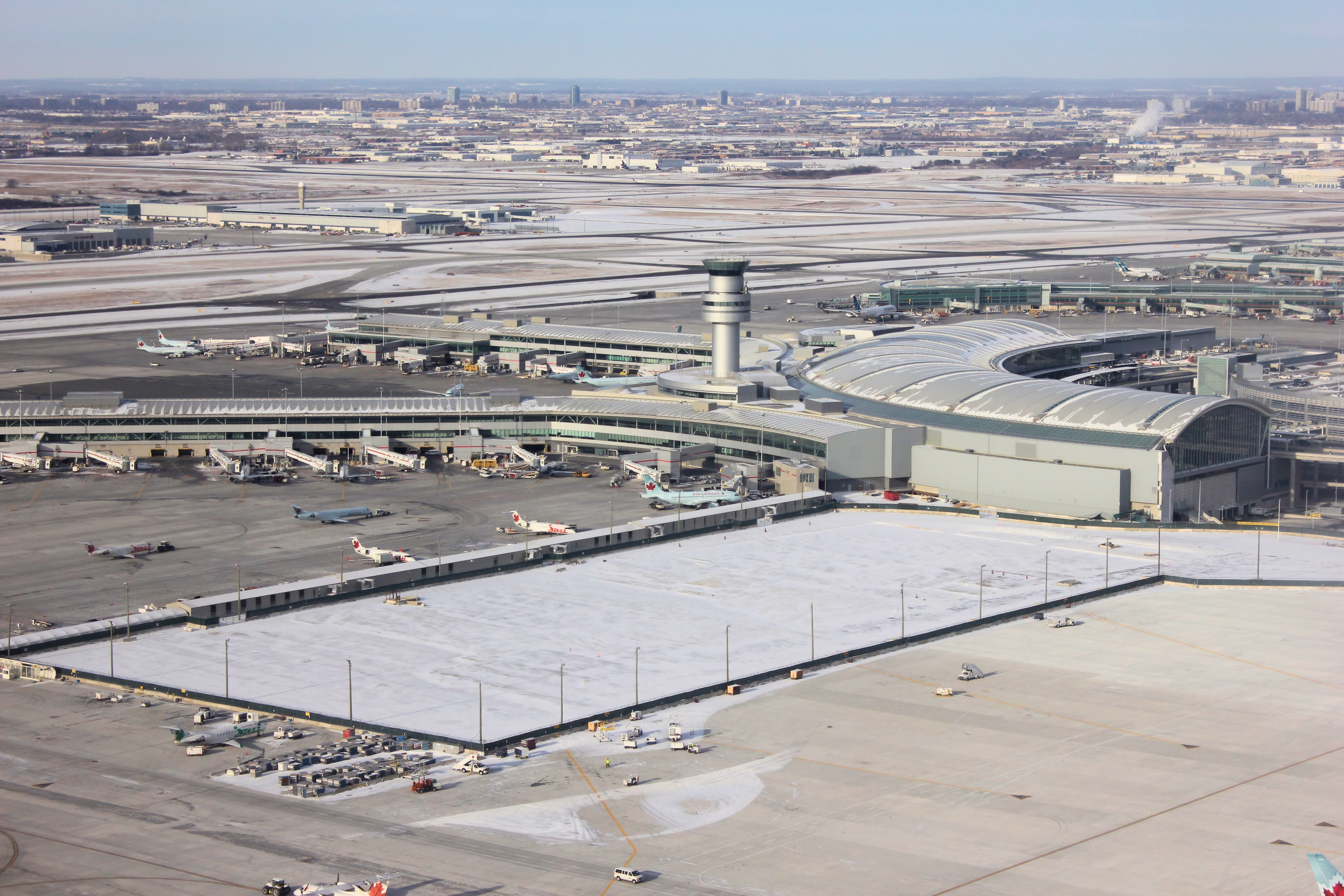
Terminal 1 of Toronto Pearson International Airport in 2012

The primary airport of the region is Toronto Pearson International Airport (officially Lester B. Pearson International Airport), located in Mississauga. Handling 46.8 million passengers in 2024, it is the busiest airport in Canada. The airport's 2019 pre-pandemic peak stood at 50.5 million passengers. Other regional airports of significance include John C. Munro Hamilton International Airport located in southern Hamilton, which is a major regional freight and courier location as well as the Region of Waterloo International Airport in Kitchener; Buttonville Airport (closed since November 2023) and Billy Bishop Airport in the Greater Toronto Area. Within driving distance is Buffalo Niagara International Airport in Cheektowaga, New York, in the United States. Buffalo Niagara carries the second-largest passenger volume in the region, serving over 5 million passengers in 2018. It is frequently used by Canadian passengers flying to US destinations.

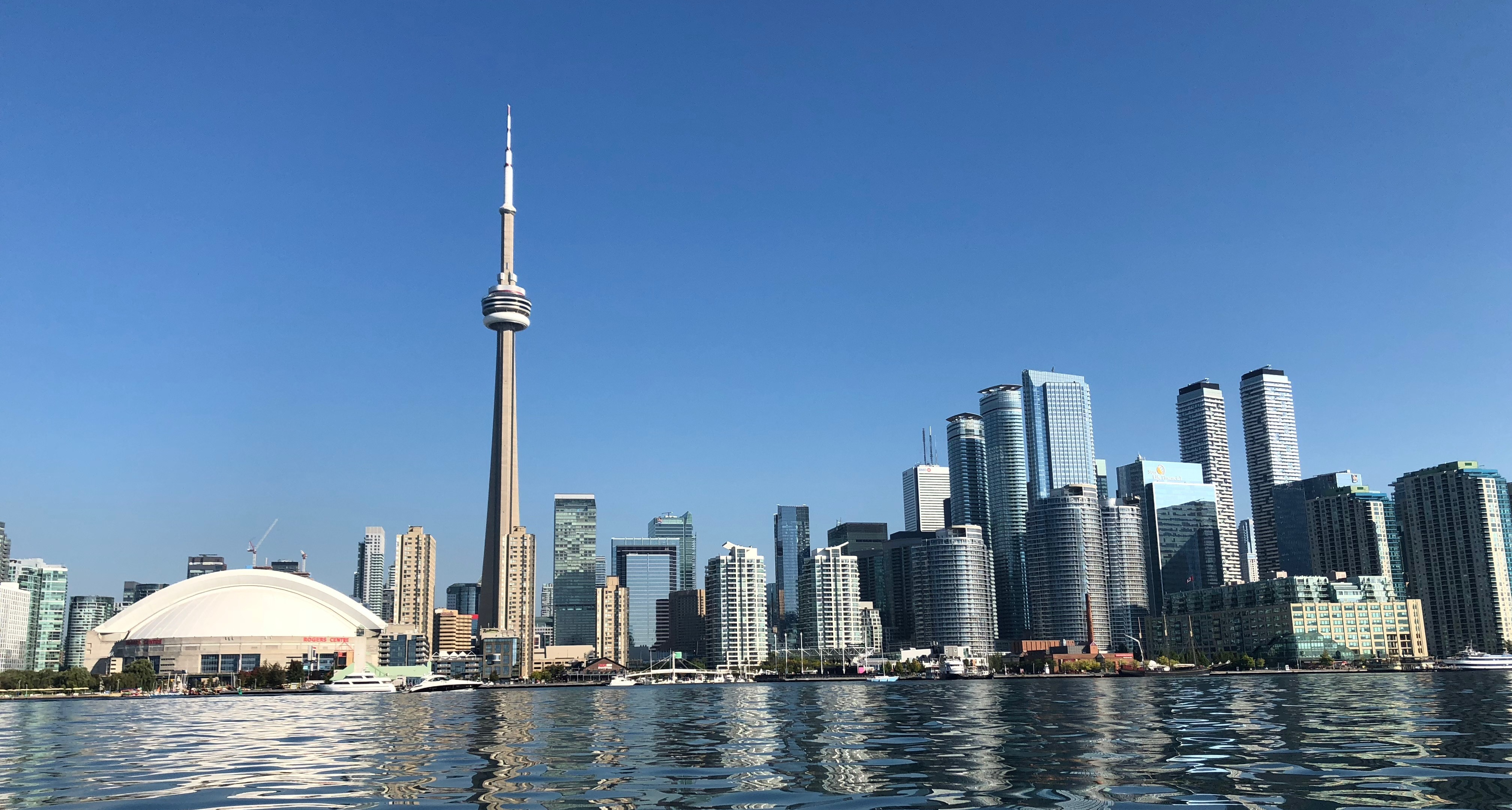
Skyline of Downtown Toronto in 2018. The city is the financial anchor of the Golden Horseshoe.

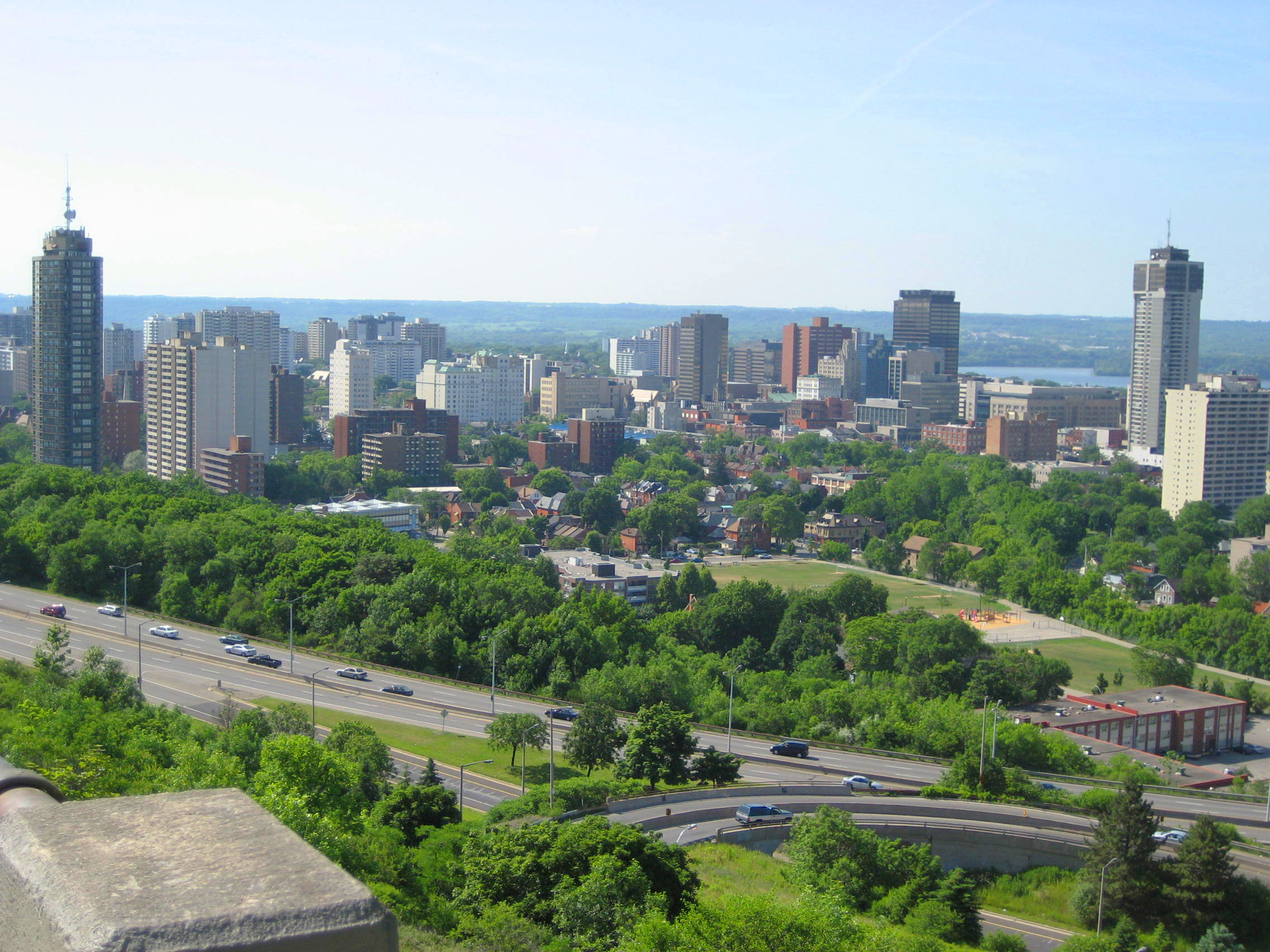
Hamilton lies at the western edge of Lake Ontario.

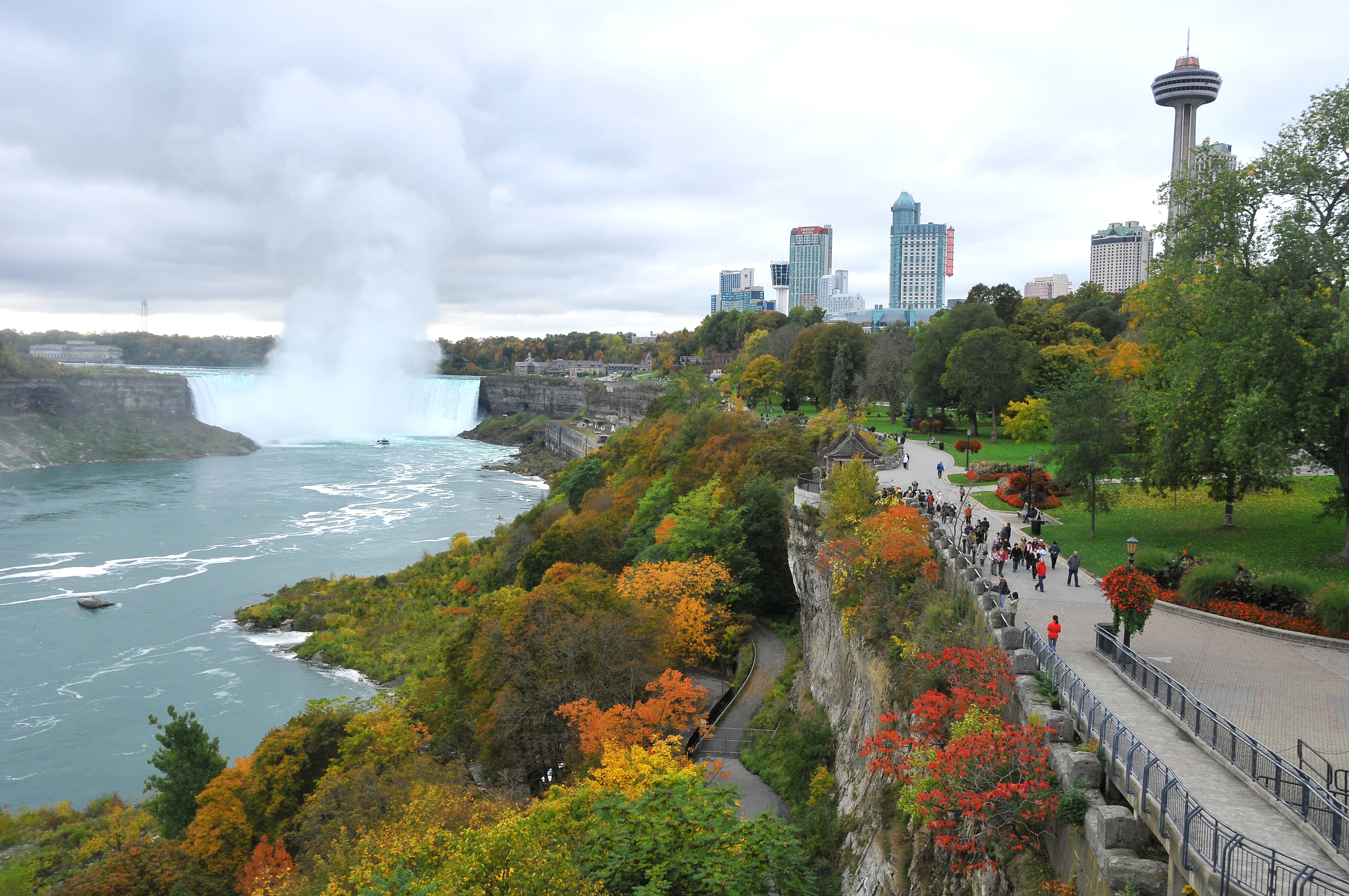
Niagara Falls is a major tourist destination, situated at the southeastern portion of the Golden Horseshoe.
