= Niagara Escarpment Biosphere Reserve =

UNESCO Biosphere Reserve in Ontario, Canada

- Réserve de biosphère de l'Escarpement du Niagara
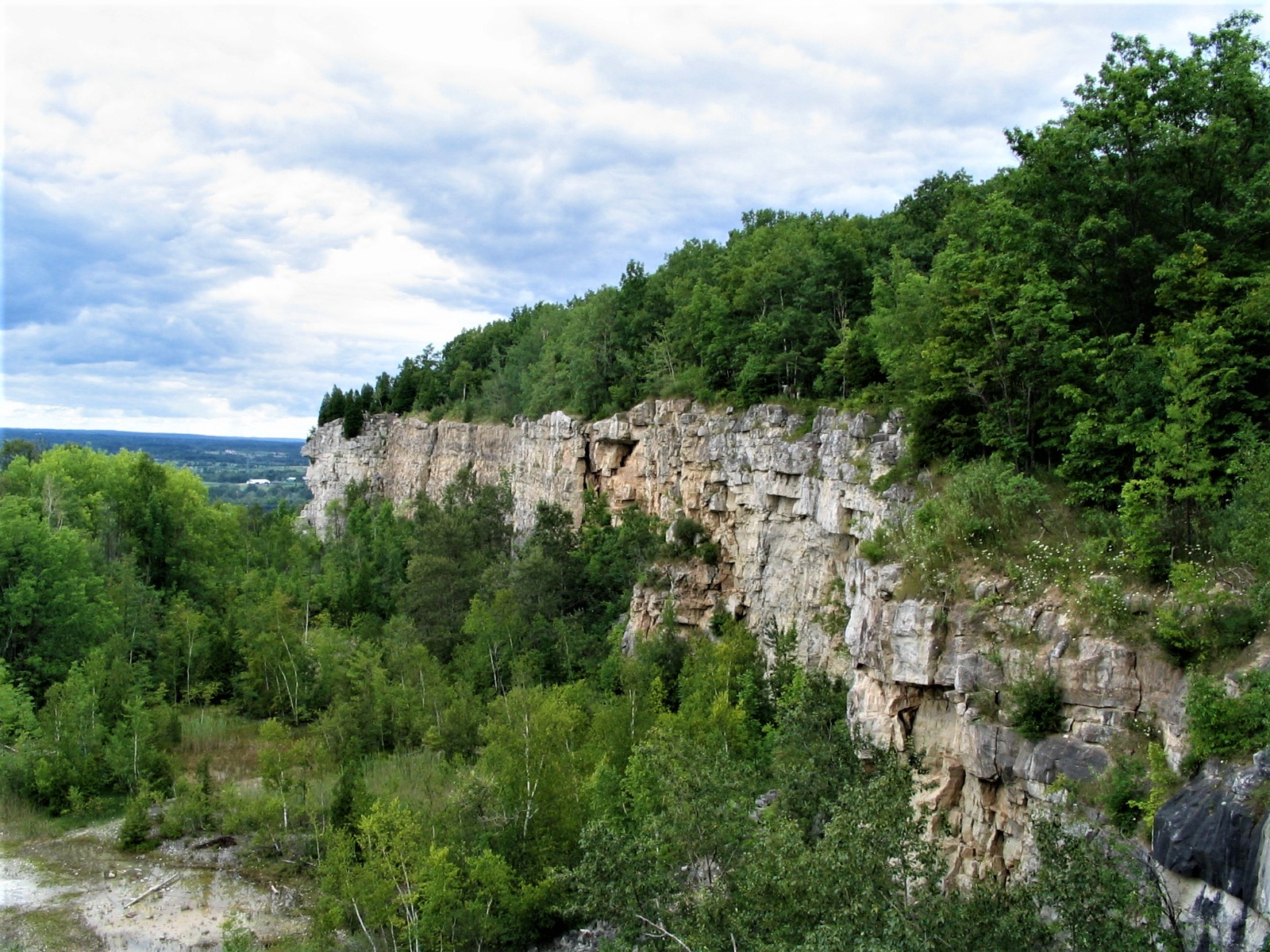
- Niagara Escarpment in Kelso Conservation Area near Milton

- Location within Southern Ontario Location within Canada
- Location: Ontario, Canada
- Coordinates: 44°11′56″N 80°21′06″W
- Area: 194,555 hectares (751.18 sq mi)
- Governing body: Niagara Escarpment Commission (Commission de l'escarpement du Niagara)

The Niagara Escarpment Biosphere Reserve (French: Réserve de biosphère de l'Escarpement du Niagara) (established 1990) is a UNESCO Biosphere Reserve located in Ontario, Canada. The reserve stretches 725 kilometres (450 mi) along the Niagara Escarpment from Lake Ontario (near Niagara Falls) to the tip of the Bruce Peninsula (between Georgian Bay and Lake Huron). The Escarpment corridor crosses two major biomes: needle leaf forests in the north and temperate broadleaf forest in the south.

== Area ==
The reserve's surface area is 194,555 hectares (751.18 sq mi). The core area is 66,163 hectares (255.46 sq mi), surrounded by buffer zone(s) of 114,488 hectares (442.04 sq mi) and transition area(s) of 13,904 hectares (53.68 sq mi).

== Ecological characteristics ==
The Niagara Escarpment represents the largest contiguous stretch of primarily forested land in south-central Ontario. The biosphere reserve includes the greatest topographic variability in southern Ontario, with habitats ranging over more than 430 metres (1,410 ft) in elevations and including Great Lakes coastlines, cliff edges, talus slopes, wetlands, woodlands, limestone alvar pavements, oak savannahs, conifer swamps and many others. These habitats collectively boast the highest level of species diversity among Canadian biosphere reserves, including more than 300 bird species, 55 mammals, 36 reptiles and amphibians, 90 fish and 100 varieties of special interest flora.

The Niagara Escarpment stretches 725 kilometres (450 mi) along the entire eastern edge of the Bruce Peninsula, a globally significant area covering 1,700 square kilometres (660 sq mi) at the tip of which lies Bruce Peninsula National Park. Within the park the escarpment forms the Georgian Bay shoreline and constitutes part of the core area of the biosphere reserve. The park consists of an array of habitats ranging from rare alvars to dense forests and clean lakes, with over 1,000-year-old cedar trees growing among the rugged cliffs. Along with Fathom Five National Marine Park, the Bruce Peninsula National Park facilitates access to the shores of Lake Huron, the fifth largest freshwater lake in the world.

== Socio-economic characteristics ==
The combined population of all the upper and single tier areas that span the Niagara Escarpment Biosphere Reserve amounts to approximately 1,313,000 people, according to the 2011 Canadian census.

Economic development varies throughout the biosphere reserve in accordance with the diverse landscapes, natural resources and cultural attractions found along the Niagara Escarpment. Some local communities are facing lifestyle changes as new economies emerge, while others are coping with static, decreasing or aging populations and are searching for new ways to maintain the viability of local economies and cultures. Development pressures related to population growth in southern Ontario are also increasing, in particular the need for construction materials, residential expansion and provision of access to recreation spaces.

Prevailing trends over the past decade in the main sectors of the economy include the sustainable use of natural resources, mineral resource extraction, agro-tourism, production of local food and Niagara peninsula wine, and eco-tourism.

== Niagara Escarpment Commission ==
Niagara Escarpment Commission
- Commission de l'escarpement du Niagara
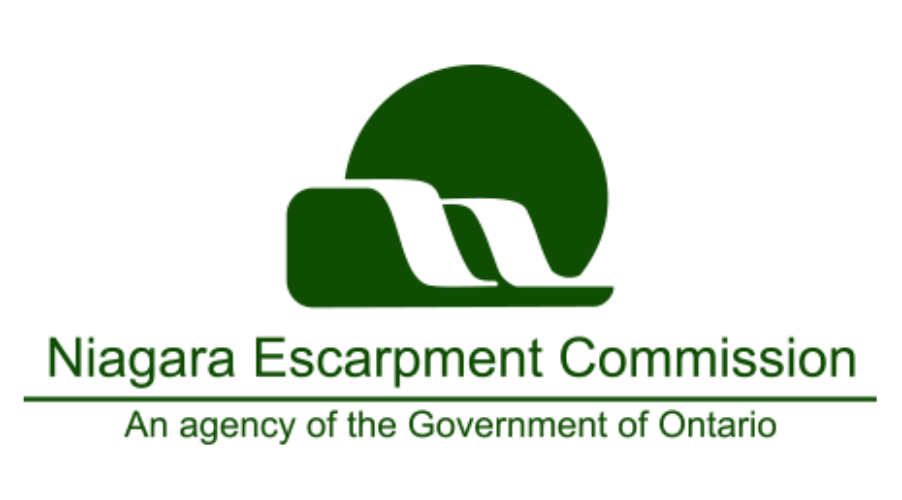

Agency overview
- Formed: 1973
- Type: Crown agency
- Jurisdiction: Government of Ontario
- Headquarters: Thornbury, Ontario and Georgetown, Ontario, Canada
- Minister responsible: Graydon Smith, Minister of Natural Resources and Forestry
- Agency executive: Rocco Vacca, Chair
- Key document: Niagara Escarpment Planning and Development Act
- Website: www.escarpment.org

The Niagara Escarpment Commission (French: Commission de l'escarpement du Niagara), founded in June 1973 by the Niagara Escarpment Planning and Development Act, is an agency of the Ontario government. Its mission is to "conserve the UNESCO-designated Niagara Escarpment Biosphere Reserve as a continuous natural environment and scenic, working countryside". The Niagara Escarpment Commission published the first Niagara Escarpment Plan in 1985. This plan is reviewed and updated every five years, with the most recent version of the plan published in 2017.

The Niagara Escarpment Commission has essentially the same powers and responsibilities as a municipality, including control over zoning and bylaws.

The Commission staff are split between two geographical offices:

- (MTO Complex) Owen Sound, Ontario - north
- (Guelphview Square) Georgetown, Ontario - south

=== Members ===
- 8 Public Members at Large including the Commission Chair
- 8 municipal representatives from:
  - Bruce County - Escarpment runs on the eastern edge of the county
  - Dufferin County - Escarpment runs on the eastern edge of the county
  - Grey County - Escarpment runs on the eastern edge of the county
  - Simcoe County - Escarpment runs on the western edge of the county
  - Halton Region - Escarpment runs on the western edge of the region
  - Peel Region - Escarpment runs on the western edge of the region
  - Niagara Region - Escarpment runs on the northern edge of the region
  - City of Hamilton - Escarpment runs through the city

== Gallery ==
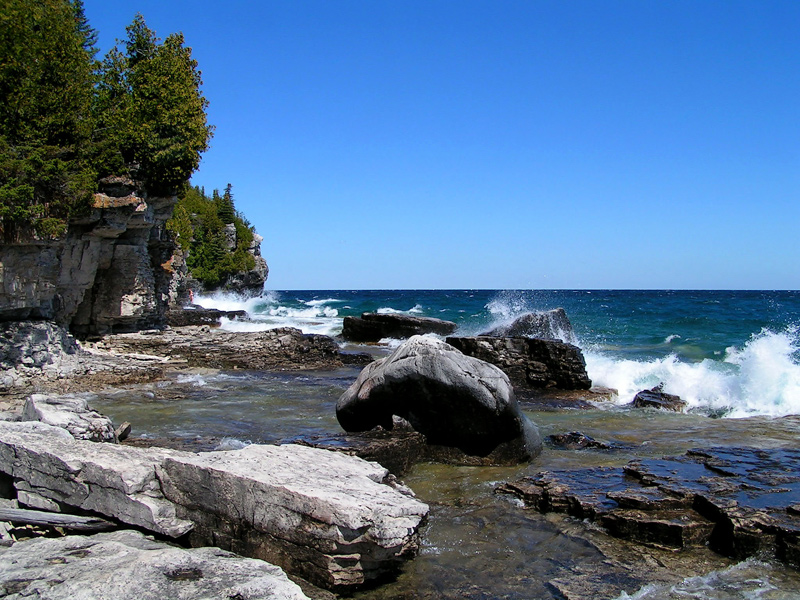
Bruce Peninsula, on the shores of Georgian Bay

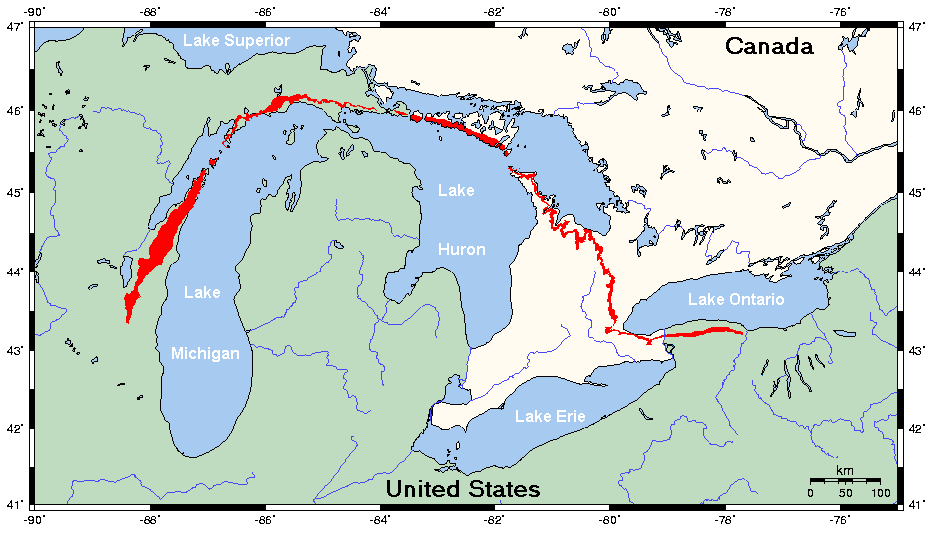
Niagara Escarpment (in red)

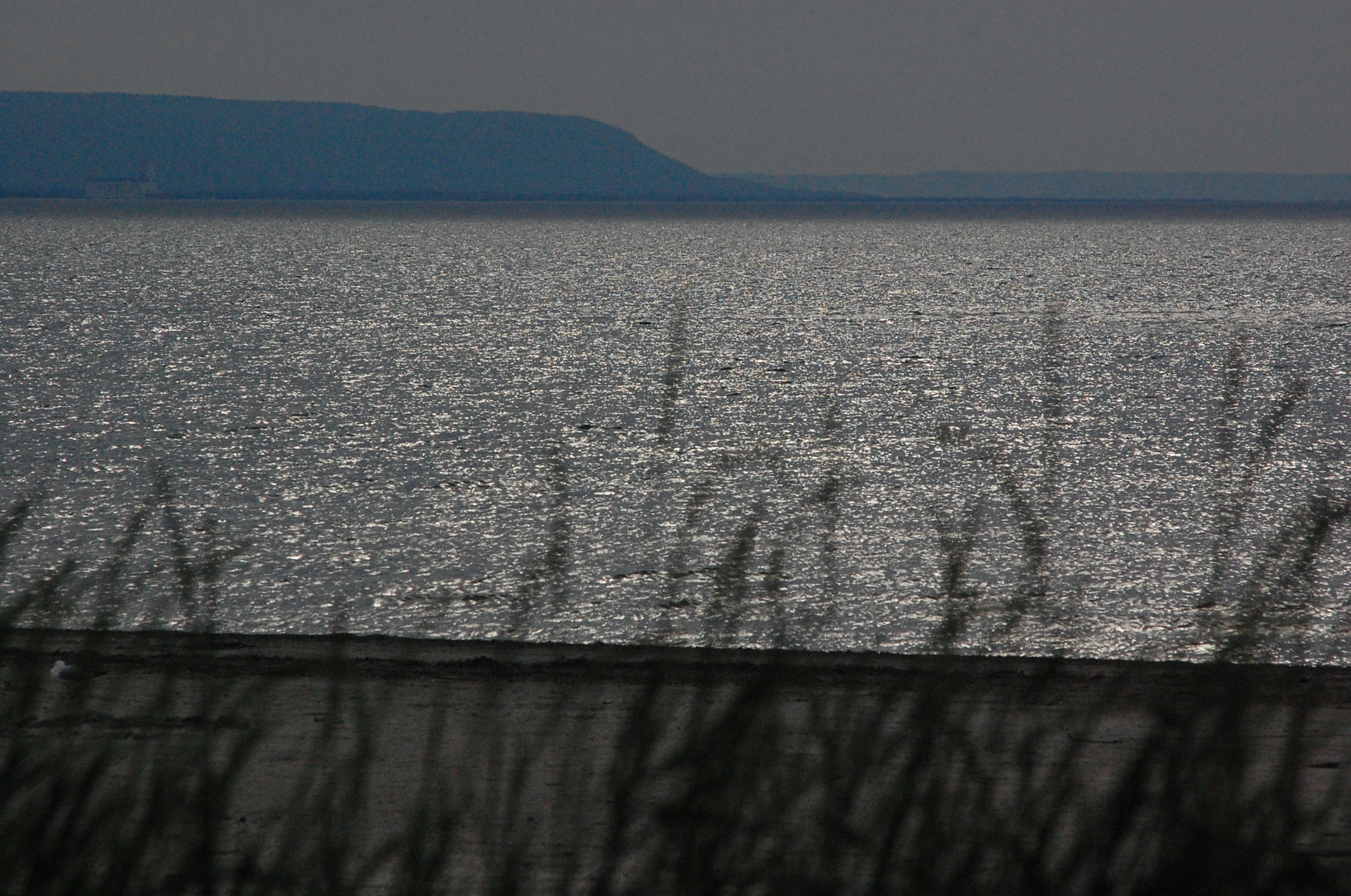
Niagara Escarpment, where it makes its southernmost approach to Georgian Bay

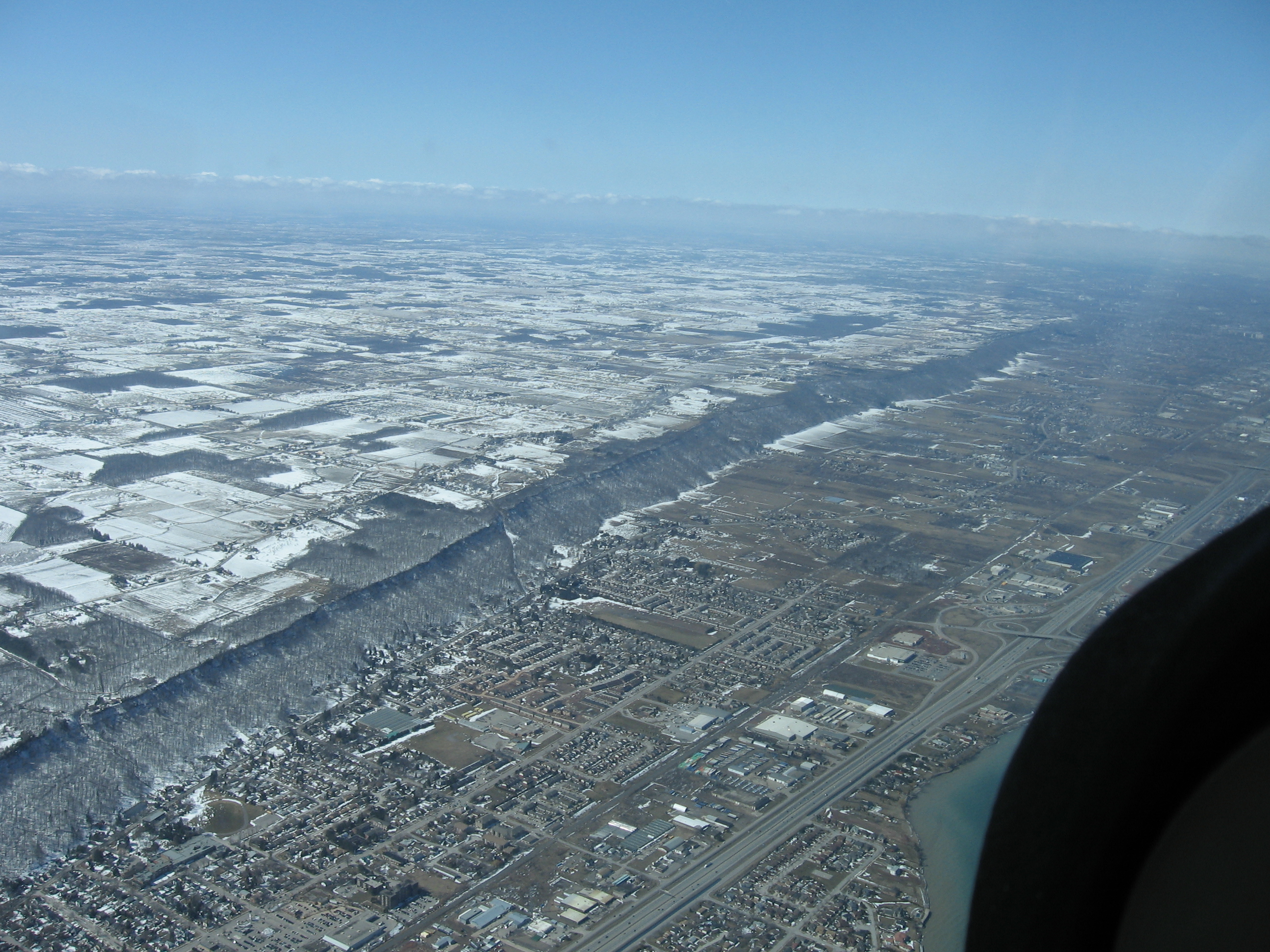
Aerial view of Niagara Escarpment near Grimsby, Ontario

== See also ==
- Biosphere Reserves of Canada
- Greenbelt (Golden Horseshoe)

== Sources ==
This article incorporates text from a free content work (license statement/permission). Text taken from UNESCO - MAB Biosphere Reserves Directory, UNESCO, UNESCO.
