= Growth Plan for the Greater Golden Horseshoe =

The Growth Plan for the Greater Golden Horseshoe, 2006 (the Plan) is a regional growth management policy for the Greater Golden Horseshoe (GGH) area of southern Ontario, Canada. Introduced under the Places to Grow Act in 2005, the Plan was approved by the Lieutenant Governor in Council and enacted on June 16, 2006. Administered by the Ontario Ministry of Infrastructure (MOI), the plan identifies density and intensification targets, urban growth centres, strategic employment areas, and settlement area restrictions designed to mitigate negative environmental, economic, and human health impacts associated with sprawling, uncoordinated growth in the region.

== History ==
The Government of Ontario first asserted its role in municipal land use planning through enactment of the City and Suburban Plan Act in 1912. In the Post-World War II period, considerable urban and suburban growth pressures demanded increased provincial intervention in municipal planning through official plan and zoning by-law requirements, and specialized administrative bodies. The Ontario Municipal Board, an independent administrative board, acts as an adjudicative tribunal on all applications and appeals regarding municipal and planning disputes in the province. A legislative structure consisting of provincial statutes and policies, municipal official plans, and land use control instruments (e.g., subdivision control, zoning by-laws) exists in the province today.

While Dalton McGuinty’s majority Liberal government introduced the Growth Plan in 2006, the origin of related smart growth policy goals in Ontario can be traced to the Common Sense Revolution of the Mike Harris government in the late 1990s. This period was initially characterized by governance reforms aimed at reducing provincial involvement in land use planning and funding of urban infrastructure such as public transit in Ontario. A combination of business and municipal concerns over the negative economic impacts of traffic congestion, rising costs of suburban infrastructure maintenance, and increased citizen opposition to development on the Oak Ridges Moraine pushed the Harris government to re-engage in land use planning. In particular, the unexpected activism of exurban homeowners and urban environmentalists protesting applications for development on the Oak Ridges Moraine "challenged urban sprawl…and introduced the notion of integrated regional planning that would simultaneously preserve nature and control development."

To address these concerns, the Harris government articulated a "smart growth" vision for development in the GGH region and established multi-stakeholder regional smart growth panels in April 2001. The Oak Ridges Moraine Conservation Act, 2001 introduced significant land use and development restrictions in designated areas throughout the Oak Ridges Moraine. While this partially addressed the smart growth goal of ecological preservation, it failed to enact any controls on urban expansion in others areas throughout the GGH or address concerns over preservation of prime agricultural lands outside the Moraine.

This lack of commitment did not go unnoticed during campaigns for the 2003 provincial election. The Strong Communities platform of the Liberal Party of Ontario was formulated in "direct response to both public and expert pressures to combat the economic, social, and environmental problems associated with suburban expansion." (Eidelman 2010, p. 1214) It promised the introduction of policies and legislation that would: create a 600,000 acre Greenbelt in the GGH; direct infrastructure investments to support compact growth in existing city centres and urban nodes; and articulate a long-term growth management strategy for the GGH taking into account population and employment projections while protecting areas of agriculture, ecological, and recreational significance. The Liberal Party won the 2003 provincial election and Eidelman argues this may be due in large part to their addressing growing anti-sprawl sentiment among critical suburban voters at the time.

Post-election the Government of Ontario enacted a series of policies and policy reforms that carried through on commitments made in the Smart Communities platform. Revisions were made to the Provincial Policy Statement, 2005 (PPS)-overarching planning legislation with which all planning decisions in the province must be consistent-to better reflect the smart growth planning goals of the province. Subsequent enactment of the Greenbelt Act, 2005 and the Places to Grow Act, 2005 (PTGA) set the stage for the Greenbelt Plan, 2005 and the Growth Plan for the Greater Golden Horseshoe, 2006 respectively.

The Growth Plan introduced a variety of mechanisms for managing growth in the GGH region, including population and employment intensification targets, settlement area restrictions, and designated urban growth centres. The complementary Greenbelt Plan restricts development in more than 700,000 hectares of "protected countryside" surrounding the "inner ring" of built up area in the GGH. It includes areas previously covered in the Niagara Escarpment Plan, 2005 and Oak Ridges Moraine Conservation Plan, 2002, as well as prime agricultural areas, natural heritage areas, and rural countryside areas, each with varying degrees of permissions for non-urban uses. The two plans work together—the former restricting areas where development can occur, and the latter dictating where and how growth shall occur in the GGH region.

== Growth Plan policies and objectives ==
This section presents a summary of key policies and objectives of the Growth Plan, following a sub-structure similar to the plan itself.

=== Context and vision ===
This section speaks to the Plan's interests in promoting economic prosperity, creating a cleaner environment for investment decisions, and helping to secure the future prosperity of the GGH region. The Plan is based on a 25-year planning horizon, from when it was introduced to 2031. The plan sets out a vision for the GGH to be a great place to live in 2031, have a clean and healthy environment, strong economy and social equity, and easy travel through an integrated transportation network. The GGH will function as Canada's principal international gateway and will have a high standard of living and exceptional quality of life. Building compact and complete communities, promoting collaboration among all sectors, and providing for different approaches to manage growth are some of the principles which will provide the basis for guiding decisions on how land is developed, resources are managed and public dollars invested.

The general authority of the Plan is derived from the PTGA, 2005 and applies to the GGH lands designated by Ontario Regulation 416/05 and shown in Schedule 1 of the Plan. While certain policies have specific target dates, the goals and policies of the Plan are intended to be achieved by 2031. The Plan is meant to work with municipal official plans, not replace them. As such, the Plan should be read in conjunction with the applicable PPS and relevant provincial plans, including the Greenbelt Plan, Niagara Escarpment Plan, and Oak Ridges Moraine Conservation Plan.

The plan prevails where there is a conflict between it and the PPS, unless there is a conflict between policies relating to the natural environment or human health, where the plan that provides the most protection prevails. Detailed conflict provisions are set out in the PTGA. Each section of the Plan contains specific policies as well as requirements for coordination between the Minister of Infrastructure (MOI), other Ministers of the Crown (CM), municipalities and other relevant stakeholders.

=== Where and how to grow ===
==== Context ====
The GGH is one of the fastest growing regions in North America, thus the Plan focuses growth toward intensification areas-including urban growth centres, intensification corridors, major transit station areas, brownfield and greyfield sites-to increase intensification of the existing built-up area. The Plan stresses the importance of building Complete Communities, whether urban or rural, which offer housing and services to meet the needs of people at all stages of life.

==== General information ====
This section of the plan includes policies for population and employment growth forecasts, managing growth, general intensification, urban growth centres, major transit station areas and intensification corridors, employment lands, designated Greenfield areas, settlement areas and boundary expansion, and rural areas. The policies establish intensification and density targets for areas throughout the GGH, and expectations for conformity to the Plan and accommodation of growth forecasts.

==== Schedules ====
See Schedule 3 for population and employment growth forecasts for all upper- and single-tier municipalities in the GGH. See Schedule 4 for identification of urban growth centres for the GGH. An interactive map of urban growth centres and their boundaries is available on the Places to Grow website.

==== Example policies ====
- Focusing intensification in already built-up areas, including urban growth centres, major transit station areas, and intensification corridors
- By the year 2015 and for each year thereafter a minimum of 40% of all annual residential development in each upper- and single-tier municipality will be within the 2006 built-up area
- Minimum density targets of between 150 and 400 residents and jobs combined per hectare for each urban growth centre must be met by 2031.
- Each upper- and single-tier municipality must achieve a minimum density target of 50 residents and jobs combined per hectare in designated green field areas by 2031.

=== Infrastructure to support growth ===
==== Context ====
The Plan provides the framework for infrastructure investments in the GGH, so that existing infrastructure and future investments are optimized to serve growth to 2031 and beyond. The focus is on intensification, compact urban form, transportation infrastructure, investment in water and waste water systems, and community infrastructure. An overarching goal is efficient capital investment in compact urban form to reduce capital costs.

==== General information ====
This section includes policies on infrastructure planning, general transportation, moving people, moving goods, water and waste systems, and community infrastructure.

==== Schedules ====
See Schedule 5 for a map of proposed future transit infrastructure investments. See Schedule 6 for a map of proposed future goods movement infrastructure investments.

=== Protecting what is valuable ===
==== Context ====
The Plan builds on existing initiatives for the wise use and management of all resources, natural heritage, agriculture and mineral aggregates in the Ontario Heritage Act, 1990 the PPS, the Greenbelt Plan, the Oak Ridges Moraine Conservation Plan, and the Niagara Escarpment Plan.

==== General information ====
The sections on "Natural Systems", "Prime Agricultural Areas", and "Mineral Aggregate Resources" all include policies for coordination between the MOI and other CM, municipalities and other relevant stakeholders. These sections also include policies for carrying over provincial plan policies, and other policies relevant to each respective section. Section 4.2.4. "A Culture of Conservation" includes policies for the development and implementation of water and energy conservation, air quality and waste management objectives in municipal official plans.

=== Implementation and interpretation ===
==== Context ====
The coordination and collaboration of all levels of government, non-governmental organizations, the private sector, and citizens will be required for the success of the Plan. An index is under development to help monitor the Plan's progress. The PTGA provides the legislative framework for the Plan, and includes the requirement that the MOI review the Plan at least every 10 years after it came into effect.

==== General information ====
This section includes policies pertaining to implementation analysis, general implementation and interpretation, coordination, monitoring and performance measures, and public engagement.

=== Simcoe Sub-Area Amendment ===
==== Context ====
Added as an amendment in 2012, the policies in this section direct a significant portion of growth within the Simcoe Sub-area to communities where development can be most effectively serviced. The policies also provide a greater range of opportunities for how growth can occur in the sub-area, with an emphasis on directing growth to primary settlement areas.

==== General information ====
This section contains policies pertaining to growth forecasts, managing growth in settlement areas and primary settlement areas, and employment lands.

==== Schedules ====
See Schedule 7 for detailed population and employment forecasts for each city and township in the Simcoe Sub-area See Schedule 8 for designated employment areas, employment districts and primary settlement areas for the Simcoe Sub-area

=== Definitions ===
For detailed definitions of terms used throughout the summary above, and in the Plan generally, see section 7 of the Plan itself.

=== Schedules ===
The Schedules include maps, tables and figures referenced throughout the Plan. Schedules included in the Plan are as follows:

- Schedule 1 – Greater Golden Horseshoe Growth Plan Area
- Schedule 2 – Places to Grow Concept
- Schedule 3 – Distribution of Population and Employment for the Greater Golden Horseshoe 2001-2031
- Schedule 4 – Urban Growth Centres
- Schedule 5 – Moving People – Transit
- Schedule 6 – Moving Goods
- Schedule 7 – Distribution of Population and Employment for the City of Barrie, City of Orillia and County of Simcoe to 2031
- Schedule 8 – Simcoe Sub-area

== Implementation ==
=== Legislative background ===
Prior to enacting the Growth Plan, the first step in interpreting the Places to Grow Act, 2005 was the identification of "growth plan areas". Municipalities that fall under jurisdiction of the Growth Plan for the Greater Golden Horseshoe were subsequently designated in Ontario Regulation 416/05. These are:

- Brant
- Dufferin
- Durham
- Haldimand
- Halton
- Hamilton
- Kawartha Lakes
- Niagara
- Northumberland
- Peel
- Peterborough
- Simcoe
- Toronto
- Waterloo
- Wellington
- York

As they fall within the designated growth plan area, these municipalities are required to amend their Official Plans (OPs) to conform to the Growth Plan. These amendments must occur at or before 3 years past the date that the Growth Plan came into effect. The Growth Plan was enacted in June 2006, thus all municipalities should have amended their plans to conform by June 2009.

Section 5.3 of the Growth Plan lists four specific efforts that municipalities (along with the Minister of Infrastructure, Minister of Municipal Affairs and Housing and other stakeholders) will undertake in order to implement the policies outlined in the growth plan. These include:

1. Confirming the built boundary
2. Assessing the need for new Greenfield areas to accommodate municipal growth forecasts in Schedule 3.
3. Identification of urban growth centres
4. Sub-assessment of regional issues including: economic analysis and employment lands; transportation networks; water and waste water servicing, natural systems, prime agricultural areas, and significant mineral aggregate resources.

=== Municipal compliance as of February 2012 ===
The process of amending an OP can be complex and there are many opportunities for appeal throughout the process. As of February 2012, only six municipalities within the GGH have amended and approved OPs which are fully in effect (City of Brantford, City of Guelph, County of Haldimand, City of Peterborough, County of Peterborough, County of Wellington). Another three municipalities (City of Barrie, Region of Halton, City of Orillia) have amended OPs which are partially in effect, with certain portions under appeal to the Ontario Municipal Board (OMB). The majority of municipalities have OPs which are currently under appeal to the OMB including; the Region of Durham, City of Hamilton, City of Kawartha Lakes, Region of Niagara, Region of Peel, County of Simcoe, City of Toronto, Region of Waterloo, and Region of York. The upper-tier municipalities of Dufferin and Northumberland have provided growth management strategies rather than specific official plans to guide development within their lower tier municipalities.

From this, it can be observed that there is a wide variation in the level of municipal compliance and commitment to the policies and goals outlined in the Growth Plan. This represents a considerable challenge, as regional planning requires consistency to be effective.

=== Official Plan Amendment case studies ===
To further examine the variation in municipal compliance with growth plan policies, several Official Plan amendment case studies are presented below.

==== Pickering ====
The City of Pickering is a lower-tier municipality within the upper-tier municipality of Durham. In 2009 the Durham Regional Council adopted Regional Official Plan Amendment (ROPA) 128, which was subsequently sent to the Ministry of Municipal Affairs and Housing for approval. The Ministry voiced several majors concerns with the plan in a letter to Durham Region in 2010. These concerns included:

- Addition of employment lands without justification.
- Exclusion of existing residential lands from the land supply analysis.
- New residential greenfield development was predominantly in the form of single and semi-detached homes, which is not a transit-supportive type of built form.

More specifically, the Ministry expressed concern over a new greenfield development being proposed in northeast Pickering, which required conversion of approximately 1200 hectares of farmland into residential uses for 30,000 new residents.

In order to address these and other concerns the Ministry proposed several modifications to the ROPA including the removal of the northeast Pickering expansion area and an intensification strategy for existing urban areas to ensure current infrastructure and land supply are used efficiently.

The response from Durham Region to the Minister's decisions was not positive as it posited that the refusals and modifications "compromised the growth management vision for the Region, and "inappropriately implemented the Central Pickering Development Plan." As such, the Durham Region has appealed the Minister's decision to the OMB, which will now be the final approval authority for ROPA 128. A final decision from the OMB has yet to be determined.

==== Guelph ====
In response to the policies outlined in the Growth Plan, the City of Guelph adopted a Local Growth Management Strategy in June 2008. The strategy provided a set of key growth principles and projected growth forecasts to inform the city's Official Plan Amendment (OPA). OPA 39 introduced the Growth Plan concepts of urban growth centres, greenfield areas, built-up areas and settlement areas into Guelph's Official Plan. Moreover, OPA 39 shows significant commitment to the goals outlined in the Growth Plan as it: outlines the creation of a Downtown Secondary Plan to meet the requirements of the designated urban growth centre (s.2.4.6.); designates a major transit station area (s.2.4.7.) and intensification corridor (s.2.4.8); and commits to compact neighbourhood development through secondary plans within greenfield areas (s.2.4.10). It also provides several overarching growth management principles including a decision that all growth will be accommodated within the existing corporate boundaries of Guelph. It is also worth noting that OPA 39 contains provisions for potentially meeting the Growth Plan intensification target of 40% of new residential development taking place within the 2006 built-up area, prior to the deadline of 2015 (s.2.4.5.1). The City of Guelph Council adopted OPA 39 in June 2009, and the Minister for Municipal Affairs and Housing granted approval of OPA 39 in November 2009.

==== Vaughan ====
Appeals to the OMB have also come from citizen groups, as seen in the case of the Official Plan amendment in the City of Vaughan. The City of Vaughan is a lower-tier municipality within the upper-tier municipality of York Region. As prescribed by the Growth Plan, the Region of York passed several Regional Official Plan Amendments (ROPAs). Among these was an amendment to expand the City of Vaughan's urban boundary (ROPA 2). This urban boundary expansion was detailed in an amendment to the city's Official Plan, previously approved by Vaughan City Council in September 2010. A local citizen environmental group, Sustainable Vaughan, strongly opposed these amendments. Sustainable Vaughan appealed the province's decision to approve these ROPAs to the OMB in October 2010. Sustainable Vaughan argued that the proposed development outside the Growth Plan settlement area did not meet the prescribed provincial criteria for urban boundary expansion. Their opposition was based on several facts, including: there was no feasibility study conducted to show whether or not development in this area could occur in a sustainable manner; there was no study undertaken to examine how development would affect prime agricultural lands in the expansion area and adjacent natural heritage areas; and ROPA 2 was missing population projections for 6 areas that were slated for development.

The OMB is currently conducting mediation and prehearing on this matter, and thus a final decision has not been given.

== Criticisms ==
The Growth Plan has been subject to substantial criticism from academics and environmental groups, as well as the Environmental Commissioner of Ontario. These criticisms have generally centred on the topics of density, the urban growth boundary, transportation, and more recently, the Simcoe Sub-area Amendment.

=== Density ===
The main concerns regarding density and the Growth Plan involve the prescribed density targets themselves, as well as how the density targets and growth projections are calculated. Questions have been raised over the underlying assumptions of density and growth projections, including concerns over the assumption that growth will continue to occur at a high rate in the region. Furthermore, concerns have been raised over the capacity of the region's environment to actually sustain such continuous and rapid growth. More technical arguments have also been made regarding the method in which density targets have been calculated, including concerns over the lack of net density calculations.

In regards to the specific density targets included in the plan, much criticism has been directed at the intensification target of 40% of all new residential development occurring in built up areas by 2015. Because this trend is already occurring in many parts of the GTA, many argue that this target does little to challenge existing growth patterns and is likely too low to result in an effective reduction in sprawl. Similar criticisms have been directed towards the Plan's minimum density target of 50 residents plus jobs per hectare for greenfield development areas. It has been argued that this level of density is not transit supportive, and enforcement of the target as an average across upper- and single-tier municipalities permits lower density development that will do little to reduce the current pattern of sprawl. Concerns over where intensification is to occur have also been voiced. In particular, intensification along the fringe of an urban growth boundary may not represent an effective use of land or existing infrastructure.

=== Urban growth boundary ===
Much controversy has developed over the policies relating to urban boundaries set out in the Growth Plan. The Pembina Institute has criticized provisions within the Plan that allow for any developments smaller than 300 hectares and proposed before enactment of the Growth Plan to be exempt from the policies and restrictions within the Plan. Pembina argues that this provision is too generous and runs contrary to the overarching urban containment goals of the Growth Plan. Schedule 2 of the Plan, the Places to Grow Concept, indicates proposed expansion of Highway 404 into Greenbelt Plan areas. This has been interpreted as a sign of weak commitment to the environmental goals of the Growth Plan and Greenbelt Plan, in favour of infrastructure development to support economic growth. The ability of the plan to prevent "leap-frogging", whereby development skips over areas protected in the Greenbelt Plan to rural and agricultural area in the "outer ring", has also been questioned. Lastly, there are concerns over the management of rural and agricultural "whitebelt" areas, which do not fall within the Greenbelt Plan area or the Growth Plan settlement area boundaries. Areas within the whitebelt contain significant natural features and agricultural lands, but the Growth Plan contains few legislated protections against their urbanization.

Some groups have also expressed economic concerns regarding the urban boundary established in the Growth Plan. There is much debate over the impacts of urban growth boundaries on housing prices. Many argue that by restricting the supply of developable land, such boundaries can drive up housing prices. A report published by the Federation of Rental-Housing Providers of Ontario suggested that the Growth Plan must do more to facilitate intensification in built up areas, as well as allow increased densities, to mitigate impacts on housing affordability.

=== Transportation ===
The development of complete communities with a range of transit options is an explicit purpose of the Growth Plan, but without sufficient densities, public transit is unlikely to become a viable option for certain settlement areas. The Pembina Institute's analysis of the Growth Plan has suggested that the minimum greenfield development density target of 50 residents plus jobs per hectare is barely sufficient to justify provincial investment in public transit infrastructure in these areas. Allotted densities in some parts of the GGH are even lower, with municipalities such as the County of Simcoe being allotted densities of only 41 residents plus jobs per hectare.

In most rural areas of the GGH, existing towns also lack sufficient densities to support transit infrastructure, which may deter the transit investment necessary to encourage intensification targets in the Growth Plan. A report by the Greenbelt Alliance suggests that this has created a self-reinforcing cycle of low density, sprawling growth that must be dealt with through a coordinated provincial and municipal intervention effort that would bring public transit investment to areas lacking sufficient densities. In the meantime, the Greenbelt Alliance has made recommendations for rural communities to engage in forms of "social transportation", such as corporate vanpooling and fixed route taxis in order to encourage growth toward densities that could later support more substantial provincial investment in public transit systems. Environmental interest groups have advised that the province and municipalities should make building transit supportive densities a high priority—to avoid the propagation of bedroom communities and an increasing environmental burden on the greenbelt, and for the benefit of complete, compact and sustainable communities.

=== Simcoe Sub-area Amendment ===
In 2009, the MOI released the Simcoe Area: A Strategic Vision for Growth report to guide local implementation of Growth Plan policies. Subsequently, the first amendment to the Growth Plan for the Greater Golden Horseshoe was enacted on January 19, 2012. This amendment affects the Simcoe Sub-area, which comprises the regional municipality of the County of Simcoe, and the single-tier municipalities of Barrie and Orillia. Commentary on the Ministry of Infrastructure's Growth Secretariat website for the Places to Grow Act provides the following statement on the purpose of the amendment:

The amended Growth Plan for the Greater Golden Horseshoe provides more specific direction for municipalities in Simcoe County and the cities of Barrie and Orillia, to implement the Growth Plan. It gives the Simcoe Sub-area planning certainty to support local decision-making, provide opportunities for job creation, and support an improved quality of life, all while limiting sprawl and protecting valuable farmland and green spaces. (Growth Secretariat, 2012)

Ceding significant regulatory oversight to the municipal councils of the Simcoe Sub-area, the provisions iterated in the new plan have attracted criticism that the amendment is in contravention of other provincial policy goals expressed in the Lake Simcoe Protection Plan, the Greenbelt Plan, and the Growth Plan for the Greater Golden Horseshoe itself. Given the sensitive ecology of the Lake Simcoe watershed, proximity of the greenbelt, and the region's predilection for uncoordinated urban sprawl, concerns around the amendment have largely been related to increased environmental impacts.

Policies within the amendment re-designate strategic employment areas along the Highway 400 corridor in Bradford West-Gwillimbury and Innisfil. A report from the Greenbelt Alliance states that this will undermine the Growth Plan's intention to curb sprawl and create complete communities, because it encourages greenfield development in isolation from existing settlement areas and infrastructure. This report also identifies concerns related to the possibility of increased leapfrog development whereby greenfield development skips over the greenbelt to areas in the "outer ring", which includes the Simcoe Sub-area. This could lead to more roadways traversing the greenbelt to connect commuters from low-density urban settlements in the County of Simcoe to employment centres in "inner ring" municipalities like Toronto. Critics are concerned about associated negative implications for air quality and climate change mitigation strategies in the GGH region.

Interest groups, such as the STORM Coalition, are concerned that the proposed Highway 400 employment corridor is counterintuitive to the "complete communities" concept of the Places to Grow Act and Growth Plan. They have criticized the transition of greenfield areas in the County of Simcoe for newly designated employment purposes given that thousands of hectares of land in other parts of the GGH are already designated for employment uses. Opponents of this development have noted that economic corridor provisions in the amended Growth Plan have been introduced prior to undertaking any Environmental Impact Assessment (EIA), which is required under the Lake Simcoe Protection Plan. An EIA is needed to determine what effects development of the Highway 400 employment corridor might have on the fragile ecology of the Lake Simcoe watershed, given the scale of new infrastructure required to support this project. The increased burden of phosphorus and water runoff into Lake Simcoe implied by the introduction of the Simcoe Sub-area Amendment is another prominent concern among environmental commentators. Studies have shown that development targets in the amended Growth Plan could result in an additional 14,328 kg of phosphorus entering Lake Simcoe every year.

The original population growth projections of 230,000 new residents within the Simcoe Sub-area had already raised concerns as to whether such a level of growth is consistent with the intensification goals of the Growth Plan. The allocation of an additional 20,000 residents at the discretion of Simcoe County under the amended Growth Plan has sparked further concern that the Simcoe Sub-area amendment favours development interests at the expense of environmental security and smart growth. (Malcolmson, 2012). Although the amended Growth Plan includes recommendations that communities implement urban and architectural designs that will increase efficiencies in energy, water, and wastewater management, these recommendations are not binding. The Simcoe Sub-area Amendment ultimately cedes discretion to municipalities within the Simcoe Sub-area to design their own environmental and urban design strategies, and determine their own patterns of growth and development.
