= Oakville (provincial electoral district) =

Provincial electoral district in Ontario, Canada

Coordinates: 43.459°N 79.678°W

Ontario electoral district
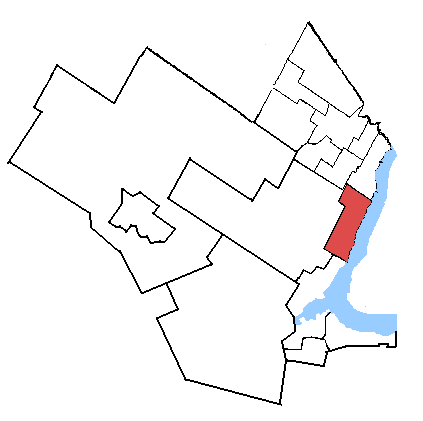
- Oakville in relation to the surrounding area ridings

Provincial electoral district
- Legislature: Legislative Assembly of Ontario
MPP
Stephen Crawford
Progressive Conservative
- District created: 1999
- First contested: 1999
- Last contested: 2025

Demographics
- Population (2016): 120,920
- Electors (2018): 92,502
- Area (km²): 94
- Pop. density (per km²): 1,286.4
- Census division: Halton
- Census subdivision: Oakville

Oakville is a provincial electoral district in Ontario, Canada, that has been represented in the Legislative Assembly of Ontario since 1999.

== Riding history ==
It was created in 1996 from parts of Halton Centre and Oakville South ridings.

It consisted initially of the part of the town of Oakville lying southeast of the Queen Elizabeth Way and Upper Middle Road.

In 2003, it was redefined to consist of the part of the town of Oakville lying southeast of a line drawn from the northeastern town limit southwest along Dundas Street East, southeast along Eight Line and southwest along Upper Middle Road to the southwestern town limit.

The current boundaries include the neighbourhoods of Lakeshore Woods, Bronte, Hopedale, Coronation Park, Kerr Village, Old Oakville, Eastlake, Glen Abbey, College Park, Iroquois Ridge, Clearview, and Joshua Creek.

=== Members of Provincial Parliament ===
Oakville
Assembly	Years	Member	Party
Riding created from Halton East and Halton West
30th	1975–1977	James Snow	Progressive Conservative
31st	1977–1981	James Snow	Progressive Conservative
32nd	1981–1985	James Snow	Progressive Conservative
33rd	1985–1987	Terry O'Connor	Progressive Conservative
Riding dissolved
Riding created from Halton Centre and Oakville South
37th	1999–2003	Gary Carr	Progressive Conservative
38th	2003–2007	Kevin Flynn	Liberal
39th	2007–2011	Kevin Flynn	Liberal
40th	2011–2014	Kevin Flynn	Liberal
41st	2014–2018	Kevin Flynn	Liberal
42nd	2018–2022	Stephen Crawford	Progressive Conservative
43rd	2022–present	Stephen Crawford	Progressive Conservative

== Election results ==
Winning party in each polling division of Oakville at the 2025 Ontario general election

2025 Ontario general election
Party	Candidate	Votes	%	±%
Progressive Conservative	Stephen Crawford	22,754	48.01	+2.57
Liberal	Alison Gohel	20,906	44.11	+6.42
New Democratic	Diane Downey	1,851	3.91	–2.87
Green	Bruno Sousa	1,235	2.61	–2.58
New Blue	Shereen Di Vittorio	556	1.17	–0.47
Moderate	Sandor Kornay	93	0.20	+0.10
Total valid votes		47,395	99.42	
Total rejected, unmarked and declined ballots		275	0.58	–0.14
Turnout		47,670	49.29	–1.00
Eligible voters		96,712		
Progressive Conservative hold		Swing		–1.92
Source: Elections Ontario

Winning party in each polling division of Oakville at the 2022 Ontario general election

2022 Ontario general election
Party	Candidate	Votes	%	±%	Expenditures
Progressive Conservative	Stephen Crawford	21,162	45.44	+1.77	$106,260
Liberal	Alison Gohel	17,554	37.69	+1.95	$109,579
New Democratic	Maeve McNaughton	3,154	6.77	–9.80	$4,422
Green	Bruno Sousa	2,416	5.19	+1.70	$3,834
None of the Above	Stephen Kenneth Crawford	846	1.82	–41.86	$0
New Blue	Mark Fraser Platt	764	1.64	–	$0
Ontario Party	Alicia Bedford	497	1.07	–	none listed
Freedom	Silvio Ursomarzo	129	0.28	–	none listed
Moderate	Andrew Titov	47	0.10	–	none listed
Total valid votes		46,569	99.29		
Total rejected, unmarked and declined ballots		334	0.71	–0.86	
Turnout		46,903	50.29	–12.18	
Eligible voters		93,268			
Progressive Conservative hold		Swing		–0.09	
Source: Elections Ontario

2018 Ontario general election
Party	Candidate	Votes	%	±%
Progressive Conservative	Stephen Crawford	24,837	43.67	+5.86
Liberal	Kevin Flynn	20,327	35.74	–13.66
New Democratic	Lesley Sprague	9,424	16.57	+8.59
Green	Emily de Sousa	1,986	3.49	–0.28
Libertarian	Spencer Oklobdzija	297	0.52	–0.25
Total valid votes		56,871	98.43	
Total rejected, unmarked and declined ballots		910	1.57	+0.63
Turnout		57,781	62.46	+6.34
Eligible voters		92,502		
Progressive Conservative notional gain from Liberal		Swing		+9.76
Source: Elections Ontario

2014 general election redistributed results
Party	Vote	%
Liberal	24,717	49.40
Progressive Conservative	18,921	37.81
New Democratic	3,994	7.98
Green	1,887	3.77
Others	518	1.04

2014 Ontario general election
Party	Candidate	Votes	%	±%
Liberal	Kevin Flynn	24,717	49.40	+1.31
Progressive Conservative	Larry Scott	18,921	37.81	–0.13
New Democratic	Che Marville	3,994	7.98	–2.26
Green	Andrew Chlobowski	1,887	3.77	+1.83
Libertarian	David Clement	386	0.77	–
Freedom	Silvio Ursomarzo	132	0.26	+0.01
Total valid votes		50,037	99.05	
Total rejected, unmarked and declined ballots		479	0.95	+0.59
Turnout		50,516	56.13	+3.42
Eligible voters		90,006		
Liberal hold		Swing		+0.72
Source: Elections Ontario

2011 Ontario general election
Party	Candidate	Votes	%	±%
Liberal	Kevin Flynn	21,711	48.09	–1.72
Progressive Conservative	Larry Scott	17,131	37.95	+3.03
New Democratic	Lesley Sprague	4,625	10.24	+3.77
Green	Andrew Chlobowski	878	1.94	–6.26
Independent	Mike Harris	498	1.10	–
Family Coalition	Jonathan Banzuela	188	0.42	–0.17
Freedom	Steve Hunter	115	0.25	–
Total valid votes		45,146	99.64	
Total rejected, unmarked and declined ballots		162	0.36	–0.15
Turnout		45,308	52.70	–5.56
Eligible voters		85,971		
Liberal hold		Swing		–2.37
Source: Elections Ontario

2007 Ontario general election
Party	Candidate	Votes	%	±%
Liberal	Kevin Flynn	23,761	49.81	–0.00
Progressive Conservative	Rick Byers	16,659	34.92	–7.26
Green	Marion Frances Schaffer	3,916	8.21	–
New Democratic	Tony Crawford	3,091	6.48	+0.13
Family Coalition	Michael James Toteda	279	0.58	–1.08
Total valid votes		47,706	99.49	
Total rejected, unmarked and declined ballots		245	0.51	–0.15
Turnout		47,951	58.26	–4.05
Eligible voters		82,304		
Liberal hold		Swing		+3.63
Source: Elections Ontario

2003 Ontario general election
Party	Candidate	Votes	%	±%
Liberal	Kevin Flynn	22,428	49.81	+17.06
Progressive Conservative	Kurt Franklin	18,991	42.18	–19.73
New Democratic	Anwar Naqvi	2,858	6.35	+2.63
Family Coalition	Theresa Tritt	751	1.67	+0.49
Total valid votes		45,028	99.34	
Total rejected, unmarked and declined ballots		298	0.66	–0.03
Turnout		45,326	62.31	+1.82
Eligible voters		72,747		
Liberal gain from Progressive Conservative		Swing		+18.39
Source: Elections Ontario

1999 Ontario general election
Party	Candidate	Votes	%	
Progressive Conservative	Gary Carr	27,767	61.90	
Liberal	Kevin Flynn	14,689	32.75	
New Democratic	Sean Cain	1,667	3.72	
Family Coalition	Adrian Ratelle	530	1.18	
Natural Law	Linda Antonichuk	202	0.45	
Total valid votes		44,855	99.31	
Total rejected, unmarked and declined ballots		312	0.69	
Turnout		45,167	60.49	
Eligible voters		74,669		
Progressive Conservative hold		Swing		–
Source: Elections Ontario

1985 Ontario general election
Party	Candidate	Votes	%	±%
Progressive Conservative	Terry O'Connor	14,265	41.66	–20.77
Liberal	Doug Carrothers	13,578	39.65	+11.86
New Democratic	Kevin Flynn	4,390	12.82	+3.05
Green	Chris Kowalchuk	2,008	5.86	–
Total valid votes		34,241	99.44	
Total rejected ballots		193	0.56	+0.06
Turnout		34,434	63.98	+7.50
Eligible voters		53,816		
Progressive Conservative hold		Swing		–16.32
Source: Elections Ontario

1981 Ontario general election
Party	Candidate	Votes	%	±%
Progressive Conservative	James Snow	16,366	62.43	+11.46
Liberal	Walt Elliot	7,286	27.79	–0.23
New Democratic	Zona Hollingsworth	2,562	9.77	–11.23
Total valid votes		26,214	99.50	
Total rejected ballots		131	0.50	+0.13
Turnout		26,345	56.49	–14.32
Eligible voters		46,637		
Progressive Conservative hold		Swing		+5.84
Source: Elections Ontario

1977 Ontario general election
Party	Candidate	Votes	%	±%
Progressive Conservative	James Snow	14,456	50.97	+5.14
Liberal	Walt Elliot	7,948	28.03	–4.49
New Democratic	Doug Black	5,955	21.00	–0.31
Total valid votes		28,359	99.63	
Total rejected ballots		104	0.37	+0.14
Turnout		28,463	70.81	–3.41
Eligible voters		40,194		
Progressive Conservative hold		Swing		+4.81
Source: Elections Ontario

1975 Ontario general election
Party	Candidate	Votes	%
Progressive Conservative	James Snow	12,933	45.84
Liberal	McLean Anderson	9,174	32.51
New Democratic	Doug Black	6,011	21.30
North American Labour	Christina Morris	97	0.34
Total valid votes		28,215	99.77
Total rejected ballots		65	0.23
Turnout		28,280	74.22
Eligible voters		38,103	
Progressive Conservative pickup new district.			
Source: Elections Ontario

== Student vote results ==
2025 Oakville student vote
Progressive Conservative	Stephen Crawford	1,547
Liberal	Alison Gohel	1,093
New Democratic	Diane Downey	639
Green	Bruno Sousa	440
New Blue	Shereen Di Vittorio	205
Moderate	Sandor Kornay	93

== 2007 electoral reform referendum ==
2007 Ontario electoral reform referendum
Side	Votes	%
First Past the Post	30,388	67.2
Mixed member proportional	14,855	32.8
Total valid votes	45,243	100.0

== See also ==
- List of Ontario provincial electoral districts
- Canadian provincial electoral districts
