= Oakville South =

Former provincial electoral district in Ontario, Canada

Ontario electoral district

Defunct provincial electoral district
- Legislature: Legislative Assembly of Ontario
- District created: 1986
- District abolished: 1996
- First contested: 1987
- Last contested: 1995

Oakville South was a provincial electoral district in Ontario, Canada. It existed from 1987 to 1999, when it was abolished into Burlington and Oakville when ridings were redistributed to match their federal counterparts. It consisted of southern parts of Oakville.

== Members of Provincial Parliament ==
- Doug Carrothers (Liberal) (1987–1990)
- Gary Carr (Progressive Conservative) (1990–1999)

Halton Centre
Assembly	Years	Member	Party
Riding created out of Halton East and Halton West
34th	1987–1990	Doug Carrothers	Liberal
35th	1990–1995	Gary Carr	Progressive Conservative
36th	1995–1999	Gary Carr	Progressive Conservative
Riding dissolved into Oakville

== Election results ==
1995 Ontario general election
Party	Candidate	Votes	%	±%
Progressive Conservative	Gary Carr	21,689	63.34	+28.36
Liberal	Lou Rocca	8,479	24.76	–9.87
New Democratic	Willie Lambert	2,973	8.68	–11.84
Family Coalition	Mike Rooney	1,103	3.22	+0.04
Total valid votes		34,244	99.24	
Total rejected, unmarked and declined ballots		263	0.76	–0.81
Turnout		34,507	71.08	+4.36
Eligible voters		48,544		
Progressive Conservative hold		Swing		+19.12
Source: Elections Ontario

1990 Ontario general election
Party	Candidate	Votes	%	±%
Progressive Conservative	Gary Carr	10,949	34.98	–5.36
Liberal	Doug Carrothers	10,841	34.63	–10.06
New Democratic	Danny Dunleavy	6,423	20.52	+10.12
Confederation of Regions	Terry Hansford	1,057	3.38	–
Green	Josef Petriska	1,038	3.32	–1.26
Family Coalition	Adriana Bassi	996	3.18	–
Total valid votes		31,304	98.43	
Total rejected, unmarked and declined ballots		499	1.57	+1.13
Turnout		31,803	66.73	+1.99
Eligible voters		47,661		
Progressive Conservative gain from Liberal		Swing		+2.35
Source: Elections Ontario

1987 Ontario general election
Party	Candidate	Votes	%
Liberal	Doug Carrothers	13,241	44.69
Progressive Conservative	Terry O'Connor	11,950	40.33
New Democratic	Tim Cooper	3,080	10.40
Green	Chris Kowalchuk	1,357	4.58
Total valid votes		29,628	99.56
Total rejected ballots		130	0.44
Turnout		29,758	64.74
Eligible voters		45,964	
Progressive Conservative pickup new district.			
Source: Elections Ontario

== See also ==
- List of Ontario provincial electoral districts
- Canadian provincial electoral districts
