= Kevin Flynn (politician) =

Canadian politician

The Honourable Kevin Flynn ECO
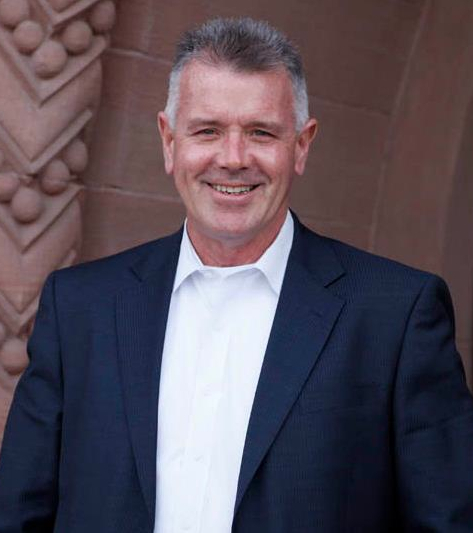
- Flynn in 2013

Minister of Labour
- In office June 24, 2014 – June 29, 2018
- Premier: Kathleen Wynne
- Preceded by: Yasir Naqvi
- Succeeded by: Laurie Scott

Member of the Ontario Provincial Parliament for Oakville
- In office October 2, 2003 – June 7, 2018
- Preceded by: Gary Carr
- Succeeded by: Stephen Crawford

Personal details
- Born: Kevin Daniel Flynn; 1955 (age 70–71) Liverpool, England
- Party: Liberal (since 1999); New Democratic (until 1999)
- Spouse: Janice Flynn
- Children: 1

Kevin Daniel Flynn (born c. 1955) is a former Canadian politician, who served as the minister of Labour from 2014 to 2018 in the Kathleen Wynne cabinet. He was a Liberal member of the Legislative Assembly of Ontario from 2003 to 2018 who represented the riding of Oakville.

== Background ==
Flynn was born in Liverpool, England. He immigrated to Canada with his family at the age of 12. Prior to entering politics, he was a small business owner and served as Chair of the Financial Department for the Royal Botanical Gardens. He and his wife Janice live in Oakville, Ontario.

== Political career ==
Flynn ran for the Ontario legislature in the provincial election of 1985, as a New Democrat. He finished a distant third in Oakville, where the NDP has a limited base of support. Later in the year, he was elected as an Oakville Town Councillor and a Halton Regional Councillor.

He ran for election to the Legislative Assembly in the riding of Oakville, this time as a Liberal, in the provincial election of 1999. He was defeated by incumbent Progressive Conservative Gary Carr.

Carr retired in 2003, and later joined the federal Liberal Party. In 2003, Flynn ran for the seat again and this time defeated Progressive Conservative candidate Kurt Franklin by about 3500 votes. The Premier appointed Flynn as parliamentary assistant to the Minister of Labour in 2004. Subsequently, Flynn served as Parliamentary Assistant to the Minister of Energy, the Minister of the Environment, the Minister of Training, Colleges and Universities, and the Minister of Education.

In the 2007 election, Flynn ran for re-election and increased his margin of victory to 7096 votes over the Progressive Conservative challenger, Rick Byers.

Flynn has worked to ensure the protection of environmentally-sensitive land in his riding and his town, which is larger than his riding. In November 2004, he was applauded by the local media for his work in reserving 1286 acres (5 km²) of land in North Oakville as public greenspace.

On November 18, 2010, Flynn was nominated as the Liberal party candidate in Oakville for the 2011 provincial election. In the 2011 election, which saw the Liberals reduced to a minority government, Flynn increased his percentage of victory, although his margin of victory was reduced to 4580 votes over the Progressive Conservative challenger, Larry Scott.

Following the election, Flynn unsuccessfully ran to become Speaker of the Legislative Assembly of Ontario, losing to fellow Liberal Dave Levac, MPP for Brant. In June 2013, he was named Chief Government Whip.

He was re-elected in the 2014 election.

On June 24, 2014, Premier Kathleen Wynne appointed him as Minister of Labour.

On June 7, 2018, he was defeated by Progressive Conservative candidate Stephen Crawford in the 42nd Ontario general election.

Ahead of the 2019 federal election, Flynn sought the federal Liberal nomination in Oakville. On June 12, 2019 Flynn lost the nomination to Anita Anand, who went on to win the general election.

=== Cabinet positions ===
Wynne ministry, Province of Ontario (2013–2018)
Cabinet post (1)
Predecessor	Office	Successor
Yasir Naqvi	Minister of Labour; 2014–2018	Laurie Scott

== Electoral history ==
2018 Ontario general election: Oakville
Party	Candidate	Votes	%	±%
Progressive Conservative	Stephen Crawford	24,837	43.67	+5.90
Liberal	Kevin Flynn	20,327	35.74	−13.69
New Democratic	Lesley Sprague	9,424	16.57	+8.63
Green	Emily De Sousa	1,986	3.49	−0.31
Libertarian	Spencer Oklobdzija	297	0.52	−0.27
Total valid votes		56,871	100.0	
Source: Elections Ontario

2014 Ontario general election
Party	Candidate	Votes	%	±%
Liberal	Kevin Flynn	24,729	49.43	+1.34
Progressive Conservative	Larry Scott	18,895	37.77	-0.18
New Democratic	Che Marville	3,973	7.94	-2.30
Green	Andrew Chlobowski	1,902	3.80	+1.86
Libertarian	David Clement	393	0.79	
Freedom	Silvio Ursomarzo	137	0.27	+0.02
Total valid votes		50,029	100.0	
Liberal hold		Swing		+0.76
Source: Elections Ontario

2011 Ontario general election
Party	Candidate	Votes	%	±%
Liberal	Kevin Flynn	21,711	48.09	+0.62
Progressive Conservative	Larry Scott	17,131	37.95	+3.08
New Democratic	Lesley Sprague	4,625	10.24	+3.59
Green	Andrew Chlobowski	878	1.94	-6.25
Independent	Mike Harris	498	1.10	
Family Coalition	Jonathan Banzuela	188	0.42	-0.17
Freedom	Steve Hunter	115	0.25	
Total valid votes		45,146	100.00	

2007 Ontario general election
Party	Candidate	Votes	%	±%
Liberal	Kevin Flynn	23,757	49.71%	-0.10%
Progressive Conservative	Rick Byers	16,666	34.87%	-7.31%
Green	Marion Schaffer	3,912	8.19%	
New Democratic	Tony Crawford	3,178	6.65%	+0.30%
Family Coalition	Michael James Toteda	281	0.59%	-1.08%
Total valid votes		47,794	100.00%	

2003 Ontario general election
Party	Candidate	Votes	%	±%
Liberal	Kevin Flynn	22,428	49.81%	+17.06%
Progressive Conservative	Kurt Franklin	18,991	42.18%	-19.72%
New Democratic	Anwar Abbas Naqvi	2,858	6.35%	+2.63%
Family Coalition	Theresa Tritt	751	1.67%	+0.49%

1999 Ontario general election
Party	Candidate	Votes	%	±%
Progressive Conservative	Gary Carr	27,767	61.90%	
Liberal	Kevin Flynn	14,689	32.75%	
New Democratic	Sean Cain	1,667	3.72%	
Family Coalition	Adrian Ratelle	530	1.18%	
Natural Law	Linda Antonichuk	202	0.45%	

1985 Ontario general election
Party	Candidate	Votes	%	±%
Progressive Conservative	Terry O'Connor	14,265	41.66%	
Liberal	Doug Carrothers	13,578	39.65%	
New Democratic	Kevin Flynn	4,390	12.82%	
Green	Chris Kowalchuk	2,008	5.86%	
