= Burlington (provincial electoral district) =

Provincial electoral district in Ontario, Canada

Coordinates: 43.3487°N 79.7903°W

Ontario electoral district
- Burlington in relation to other Greater Toronto Area electoral districts

Provincial electoral district
- Legislature: Legislative Assembly of Ontario
MPP
Natalie Pierre
Progressive Conservative
- District created: 1999
- First contested: 1999
- Last contested: 2025

Demographics
- Population (2016): 123,185
- Electors (2018): 100,455
- Area (km²): 81
- Pop. density (per km²): 1,520.8
- Census division: Halton
- Census subdivision: Burlington

Burlington is a provincial electoral district in southwestern Ontario, Canada. It elects one member to the Legislative Assembly of Ontario. It was created in 1999 from parts of Burlington South, Halton Centre, and a small part of South Oakville.

When the riding was created, it included the city of Burlington east of a line following the Queen Elizabeth Way to Highway 403 to King Road and south of a line following Dundas Street to the 403 to Upper Middle Road to Walkers Line.

In 2007, the boundaries were altered so that the riding included all of Burlington south of a line following Dundas Street to Guelph Line to Upper Middle Road to Walkers Line to the QEW.

== Members of Provincial Parliament ==
Burlington
Assembly	Years	Member	Party
Riding created from Burlington South, Halton Centre and Oakville South
37th	1999–2003	Cam Jackson	Progressive Conservative
38th	2003–2007	Cam Jackson	Progressive Conservative
38th	2007–2007	Joyce Savoline	Progressive Conservative
39th	2007–2011	Joyce Savoline	Progressive Conservative
40th	2011–2014	Jane McKenna	Progressive Conservative
41st	2014–2018	Eleanor McMahon	Liberal
42nd	2018–2022	Jane McKenna	Progressive Conservative
43rd	2022–present	Natalie Pierre	Progressive Conservative

== Election results ==
=== 2025 ===
Winning party in each polling division of Burlington at the 2025 Ontario general election

2025 Ontario general election
Party	Candidate	Votes	%	±%
Progressive Conservative	Natalie Pierre	24,118	43.14	+0.59
Liberal	Andrea Grebenc	24,079	43.07	+13.65
New Democratic	Megan Beauchemin	4,487	8.03	–9.61
Green	Kyle Hutton	1,913	3.42	–3.27
New Blue	James Chilli Chillingworth	727	1.30	–1.19
None of the Above	David Crombie	582	1.04	–
Total valid votes		55,906	99.29	
Total rejected, unmarked and declined ballots		401	0.71	+0.20
Turnout		56,307	53.59	+1.96
Eligible voters		105,077		
Progressive Conservative hold		Swing		–6.53
Source: Elections Ontario

=== 2022 ===
Winning party in each polling division of Burlington at the 2022 Ontario general election

2022 Ontario general election
Party	Candidate	Votes	%	±%	Expenditures
Progressive Conservative	Natalie Pierre	22,348	42.55	+2.10	$28,540
Liberal	Mariam Manaa	15,452	29.42	+4.82	$64,316
New Democratic	Andrew Drummond	9,262	17.64	–11.00	$52,926
Green	Kyle Hutton	3,515	6.69	+2.21	$7,024
New Blue	Allison McKenzie	1,310	2.49	–	$6,621
Ontario Party	Sebastian Aldea	633	1.21	–	$0
Total valid votes/expense limit		52,520	99.49	–	$143,149
Total rejected, unmarked and declined ballots		269	0.51	–0.56	
Turnout		52,789	51.63	–11.82	
Eligible voters		102,249			
Progressive Conservative hold		Swing		–1.36	
Source: Elections Ontario

=== 2018 ===
2018 Ontario general election
Party	Candidate	Votes	%	±%	Expenditures
Progressive Conservative	Jane McKenna	25,504	40.45	+3.50	$123,779
New Democratic	Andrew Drummond	18,053	28.63	+14.21	$14,968
Liberal	Eleanor McMahon	15,515	24.61	−18.76	$63,905
Green	Vince Fiorito	2,828	4.48	+0.34	$81
Libertarian	Jim Gilchrist	530	0.84	−	none listed
None of the Above	Nadine Bentham	471	0.75	–	$0
Consensus Ontario	Peter Rusin	154	0.24	–	none listed
Total valid votes		63,055	98.93		
Total rejected, unmarked and declined ballots		682	1.07	–0.42	
Turnout		63,737	63.45	+5.72	
Eligible voters		100,455			
Progressive Conservative notional gain from Liberal		Swing		+11.13	
Source: Elections Ontario

=== 2014 ===
2014 general election redistributed results
Party	Vote	%
Liberal	23,690	43.37
Progressive Conservative	20,181	36.94
New Democratic	7,880	14.43
Green	2,265	4.15
Others	611	1.12

2014 Ontario general election
Party	Candidate	Votes	%	±%
Liberal	Eleanor McMahon	23,573	43.41	+7.33
Progressive Conservative	Jane McKenna	20,086	36.98	–3.43
New Democratic	Jan Mowbray	7,792	14.35	–4.53
Green	Meredith Cross	2,250	4.14	+1.87
Libertarian	Charles Zach	363	0.67	–0.62
Freedom	Andrew Brannan	245	0.45	+0.14
Total valid votes		54,309	98.51	
Total rejected, unmarked and declined ballots		822	1.49	+1.03
Turnout		55,131	57.73	+2.90
Eligible voters		95,504		
Liberal gain from Progressive Conservative		Swing		+5.38
Source: Elections Ontario

=== 2011 ===
2011 Ontario general election
Party	Candidate	Votes	%	±%
Progressive Conservative	Jane McKenna	20,061	40.41	–0.93
Liberal	Karmel Sakran	17,909	36.07	–1.71
New Democratic	Peggy Russell	9,370	18.87	+7.90
Green	Alex Brown	1,129	2.27	–6.88
Libertarian	Anthony Giles	639	1.29	–
Family Coalition	Tim O'Brien	380	0.77	+0.02
Freedom	Andrew Brannan	156	0.31	–
Total valid votes		49,644	99.54	
Total rejected, unmarked and declined ballots		231	0.46	–0.06
Turnout		49,875	54.83	–4.08
Eligible voters		90,964		
Progressive Conservative hold		Swing		+0.39
Source: Elections Ontario

=== 2007 ===
2007 Ontario general election
Party	Candidate	Votes	%	±%
Progressive Conservative	Joyce Savoline	21,578	41.34	–7.67
Liberal	Marianne Meed Ward	19,724	37.79	–3.38
New Democratic	Cory Judson	5,728	10.97	+5.22
Green	Tim Wilson	4,779	9.16	+5.93
Family Coalition	Mark Gamez	391	0.75	–
Total valid votes		52,200	99.48	
Total rejected, unmarked and declined ballots		274	0.52	+0.13
Turnout		52,474	58.91	+29.54
Eligible voters		89,072		
Progressive Conservative hold		Swing		–2.15
Source: Elections Ontario

=== 2007 by-election ===
Following Cam Jackson's resignation to run for mayor of Burlington, the riding was left with a vacant seat at Queen's Park. Consequently, a by-election was called by Ontario Premier Dalton McGuinty on January 10, 2007, to be held on February 8, 2007. Joan Lougheed, who was defeated by Jackson for the mayor's post, was nominated as the Ontario Liberal Party candidate on January 4, 2007. Former Halton Regional Chair Joyce Savoline became the Progressive Conservative Party of Ontario candidate, after narrowly defeating former Miss Canada Blair Lancaster at their nomination meeting. On January 12, 2007, Brantford school teacher and community activist Cory Judson defeated former Halton District School Board trustee David Abbott for the Ontario New Democratic Party candidacy. On January 25, 2007, Frank de Jong was named the Ontario Green Party candidate.

Ontario provincial by-election, January 12, 2007 Resignation of Cam Jackson
Party	Candidate	Votes	%	±%
Progressive Conservative	Joyce Savoline	11,146	49.00	+2.85
Liberal	Joan Lougheed	9,362	41.16	–1.01
New Democratic	Cory Judson	1,309	5.76	–2.47
Green	Frank de Jong	734	3.23	+0.90
Freedom	Barry Spruce	105	0.46	–
Independent	John Turmel	89	0.39	–
Total valid votes		22,745	99.61	
Total rejected, unmarked and declined ballots		89	0.39	–0.21
Turnout		22,834	29.37	–32.14
Eligible voters		77,749		
Progressive Conservative hold		Swing		+1.93
Source: Elections Ontario

=== 2003 ===
2003 Ontario general election
Party	Candidate	Votes	%	±%
Progressive Conservative	Cam Jackson	21,506	46.15	–16.60
Liberal	Mark Fuller	19,654	42.18	+11.47
New Democratic	David Carter Laird	3,832	8.22	+3.54
Green	Julie Gordon	1,086	2.33	+1.40
Family Coalition	Vic Corvaro	523	1.12	–
Total valid votes		46,601	99.40	
Total rejected, unmarked and declined ballots		280	0.60	–0.59
Turnout		46,881	61.51	+1.05
Eligible voters		76,215		
Progressive Conservative hold		Swing		–14.03
Source: Elections Ontario

=== 1999 ===
1999 Ontario general election
Party	Candidate	Votes	%
Progressive Conservative	Cam Jackson	29,055	62.74
Liberal	Linda Glover	14,220	30.71
New Democratic	Danny Dunleavy	2,167	4.68
Green	Bruce Smith	432	0.93
Independent	Anne Marsden	289	0.62
Natural Law	Regina Law	144	0.31
Total valid votes		46,307	98.81
Total rejected, unmarked and declined ballots		558	1.19
Turnout		46,865	60.46
Eligible voters		77,516	
Progressive Conservative pickup new district.			
Source: Elections Ontario

== 2007 electoral reform referendum ==
2007 Ontario electoral reform referendum
Side	Votes	%
First Past the Post	33,067	65.7
Mixed member proportional	17,267	34.7
Total valid votes	50,334	100.0

== See also ==
- List of Ontario provincial electoral districts
- Canadian provincial electoral districts

== Sources ==
- Elections Ontario Past Election Results
- Map of Riding for 2018 election
