= Jane McKenna =

Canadian politician (born 1959)

The Honourable Jane McKenna ECO MPP
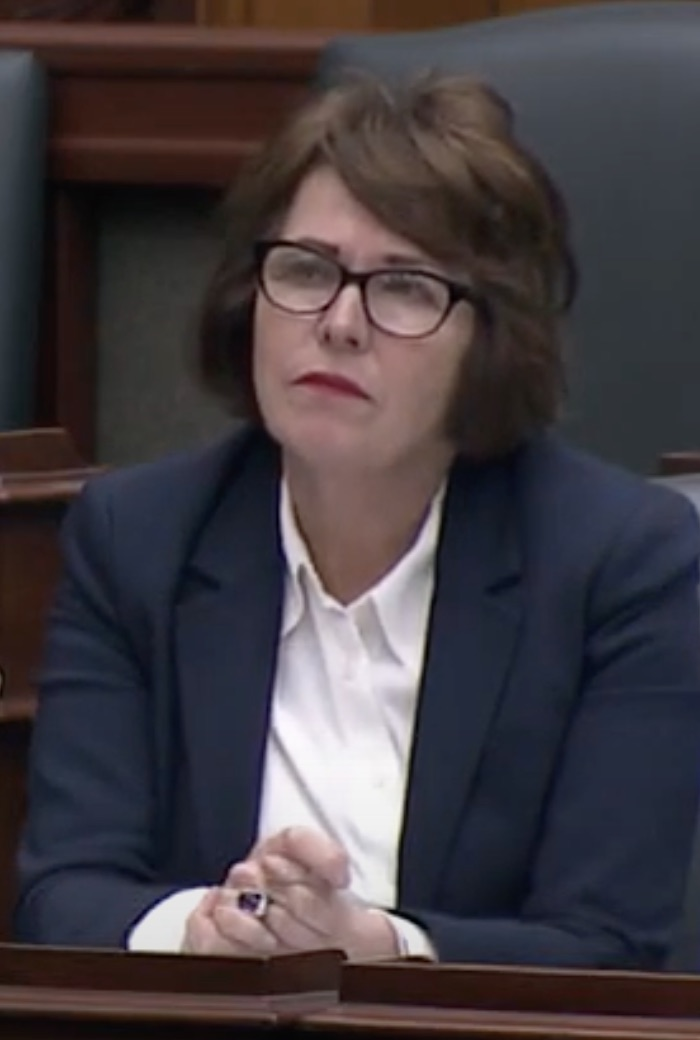

Associate Minister of Children and Women's Issues

Parliamentary Assistant to the Minister of Labour, Training and Skills Development
- In office November 29, 2018 – June 18, 2021
- Minister: Laurie Scott; Monte McNaughton

Member of the Ontario Provincial Parliament for Burlington
- In office June 7, 2018 – May 3, 2022
- Preceded by: Eleanor McMahon
- Succeeded by: Natalie Pierre
- In office October 6, 2011 – June 12, 2014
- Preceded by: Joyce Savoline
- Succeeded by: Eleanor McMahon

Personal details
- Born: October 22, 1959 (age 66)
- Party: Progressive Conservative
- Children: 5
- Occupation: Businessperson

Jane McKenna (born October 22, 1959) is a politician in Ontario, Canada. She is a Progressive Conservative member of the Legislative Assembly of Ontario from 2011 to 2014 who represented the riding of Burlington and subsequently again from 2018 to 2022. McKenna is currently the Parliamentary Assistant to the Minister of Labour; Chair of the Standing Committee on the Legislative Assembly; and Member of the Standing Committee on Estimates.

== Background ==
McKenna is a lifetime resident of Burlington, Ontario. She worked for an advertising firm and founded her own company called Rainmaker Consulting. She and her ex-husband Tim have five children and two grandchildren.

== Politics ==
In 2010, McKenna ran for the municipal election in Burlington's ward 1 but lost to incumbent Councillor Rick Craven.

McKenna was elected in the 2011 election in the riding of Burlington. She beat Liberal candidate Karmel Sakran by 2,152 votes. While MPP, McKenna served as Critic for the portfolios of Economic Development, Trade & Employment; Government Services and Children and Youth Services. While Critic for Children and Youth Services, she authored a well-regarded discussion paper, Paths to Prosperity: A Fresh Start for Children and Youth.

McKenna was defeated by Liberal candidate Eleanor McMahon in the 2014 election on June 12, 2014. She supported Patrick Brown in his successful bid to become leader of the Progressive Conservative Party of Ontario.

In December 2016, McKenna won the Progressive Conservative Party of Ontario nomination by a margin of 41 votes for Burlington, her old riding. She represented the PC party successfully in the 2018 Ontario General Election.

In the 2018 Progressive Conservative Party of Ontario leadership election, McKenna supported Caroline Mulroney's unsuccessful bid.

In the 2022 Halton Region municipal elections, Mckenna ran for the position of Regional Chair, which she lost to incumbent Gary Carr.

Following her election defeat, Mckenna was appointed as a provincial representative by the PC Government to the Halton Police Services board in March 2023.
