= James Snow =

Canadian politician

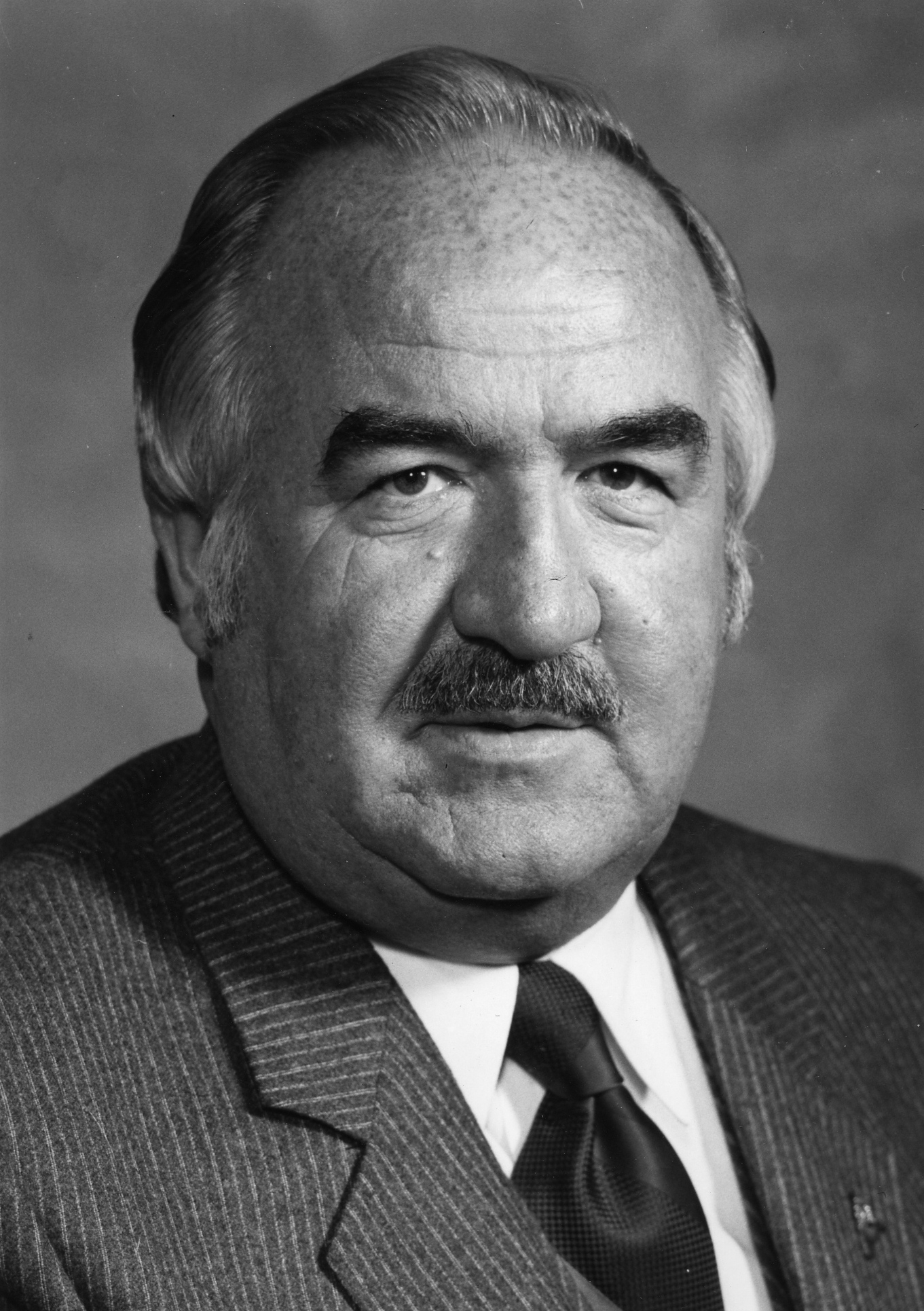
- Snow in 1980

Minister of Transportation and Communications
- In office October 7, 1975 – February 8, 1985
- Premier: Bill Davis
- Preceded by: John Rhodes
- Succeeded by: George McCague

Minister of Government Services
- In office February 2, 1972 – October 7, 1975
- Premier: Bill Davis
- Preceded by: James Auld
- Succeeded by: Margaret Scrivener

Member of the Ontario Provincial Parliament for Oakville Halton East (1967-1975)
- In office 1967–1985
- Preceded by: New riding
- Succeeded by: Terry O'Connor

Personal details
- Born: James Wilfred Snow; July 12, 1929; Esquesing Township, Ontario
- Died: September 13, 2008 (aged 79); Milton, Ontario
- Political party: Progressive Conservative
- Spouse: Barbara Hughes
- Children: 4
- Occupation: Farmer, businessman

James Wilfred Snow (July 12, 1929 – September 13, 2008) was a politician in Ontario, Canada. He was a Progressive Conservative Party member of the Legislative Assembly of Ontario from 1967 to 1985 who represented the GTA ridings of Halton East and Oakville. He served as a cabinet minister in the governments of Bill Davis and Frank Miller.

== Background ==
He was born in Esquesing Township, Ontario. He was the son of Wilfred Oliver Snow and Margaret Florence Devlin. He was educated in Milton. He worked as a farmer and a carpenter and he started his own business called Snow Construction Ltd. which built houses in post war Ontario. In 1950 he also founded Snow Properties Ltd. and Oakville Investments Ltd. In 1969 he created another company in Streetville, Tube-Fab Ltd. which made aircraft parts. In 1953 he married Barbara Hughes and together they raised four children.

== Politics ==
Snow was elected to the Ontario legislature in the 1967 provincial election defeating Liberal candidate Robin Skuce by 164 votes in Halton East. He served as a backbench supporter of premier John Robarts for the next four years. In 1967 he introduced a resolution urging the province to adopt Canada's national building code. On March 1, 1971, he was named a minister without portfolio when Davis replaced Robarts as Premier. He was re-elected with a much increased majority in the 1971 election. He was promoted to Minister of Public Works and Minister of Government Services on February 2, 1972.

The Progressive Conservatives were reduced to a minority government in the 1975 election. Snow was re-elected in the redistributed riding of Oakville, and was promoted to Minister of Transportation and Communications on October 7, 1975.

During his time as minister, he introduced mandatory seat belt legislation for adults and child restraint seats for children. In 1981, he approved the extension of Highway 404 before the completion of an environmental assessment. Even though his deputy minister claimed responsibility, he personally paid the $3,500 fine. In 1983, he pushed for the construction of a 3.4 kilometre highway linking his home town of Milton to Highway 401. He claimed that it was needed to increase industrial development.

Snow supported Frank Miller to succeed Davis as party leader in January 1985, and was retained in Miller's portfolio as a minister without portfolio responsible for Urban Transit. He retired from politics in 1985.

=== Cabinet positions ===
Ontario provincial government of Bill Davis
Cabinet posts (2)
Predecessor	Office	Successor
John Rhodes	Minister of Transportation and Communications; 1975–1985	George McCague
James Auld	Minister of Government Services; 1972–1975; Ministry was renamed from Public Works to Government Services on April 7, 1972	Margaret Scrivener

== Later life ==
Snow self-published an autobiography after leaving political life, and purchased a golf course in Hornby, Ontario. He donated his family wheelchair van to the Lions Foundation of Canada in August 2005.

In 2006 Snow and his wife Barbara donated half-a-million dollars to the Milton District Hospital Foundation's CT Scanner Campaign. The complex housing the scanner is named the "James and Barbara Snow Family Trust Diagnostic Imaging Annex".

The town of Milton, Ontario, renamed Fourth Line (in the former Trafalgar Township) James Snow Parkway (Halton Regional Road 4), with initial approval for an interchange with Highway 401 coming in 1979. It was upgraded in the early 1980s to become a major arterial road, and is in the process of being extended on both north and south ends. The overpass of the James Snow Parkway at Highway 401 was damaged in 1986 when it was hit by a fuel tanker that caught fire, necessitating that the bridge deck be entirely replaced. It was renamed after James Snow paid to pave the road extended over the 401 so he could get home faster.

Snow died on September 13, 2008, of complications from diabetes. He was 79.
