= Stephen Crawford (politician) =

Canadian politician

The Honourable Stephen Crawford ECO MPP
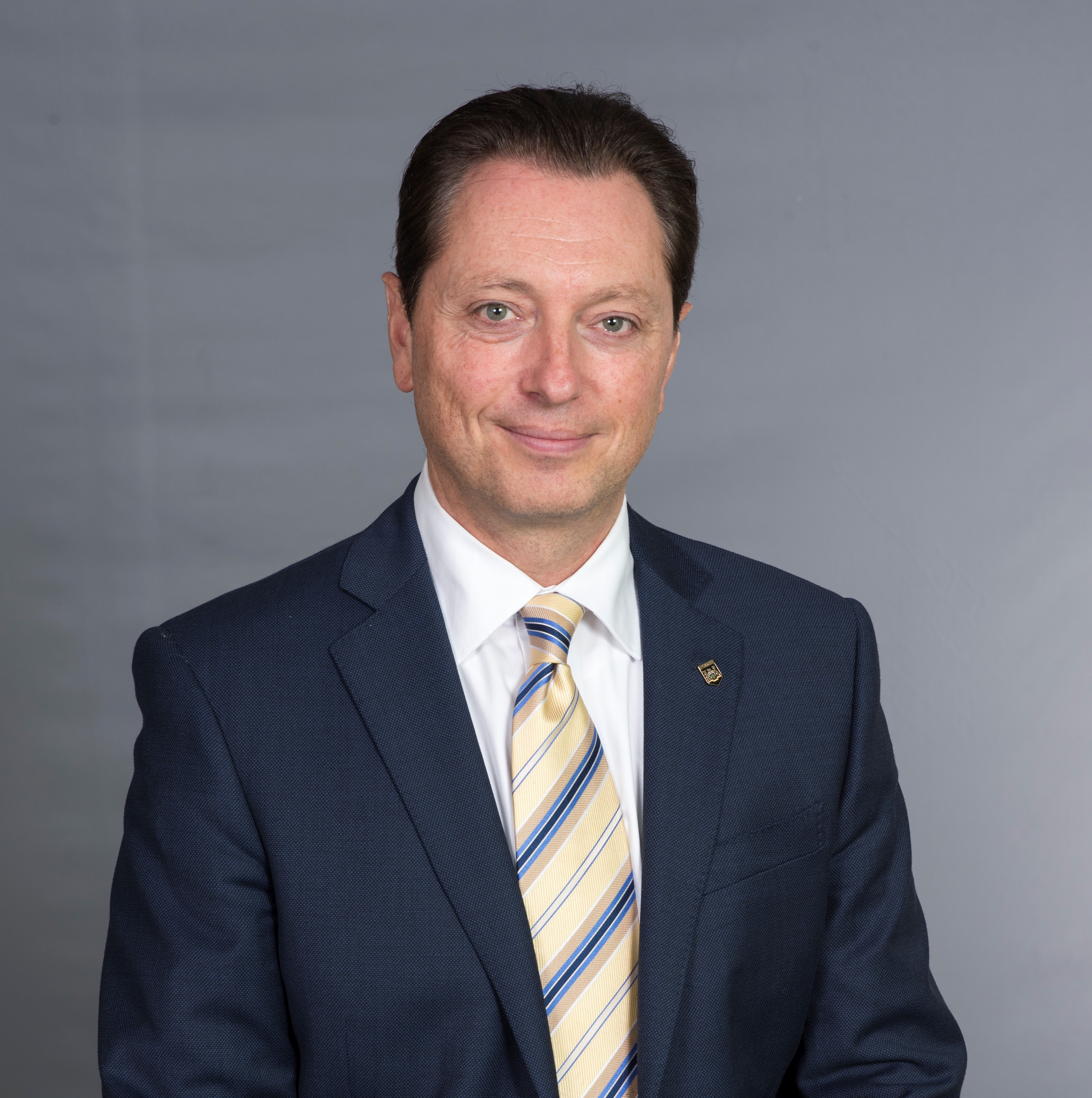

Ontario Minister of Public and Business Service Delivery and Procurement
- Incumbent
- Assumed office March 19, 2025
- Premier: Doug Ford
- Preceded by: Todd McCarthy

Parliamentary Assistant to Minister of Finance
- In office June 2, 2022 – June 6, 2024
- Minister: Peter Bethlenfalvy

Member of the Ontario Provincial Parliament for Oakville
- Incumbent
- Assumed office June 7, 2018
- Preceded by: Kevin Flynn

Associate Minister of Mines
- In office June 7, 2024 – March 18, 2025
- Minister: George Pirie

Personal details
- Born: Mississauga, Ontario, Canada
- Party: Progressive Conservative
- Spouse: Najia Crawford
- Children: 4
- Education: University of Western Ontario (B.A.)
- Occupation: Politician

Stephen John Crawford is a Canadian politician who has been the Ontario minister of public and business service delivery and procurement since 2025. Crawford has been the member of Provincial Parliament (MPP) for Oakville since 2018, representing the Ontario Progressive Conservative (PC) Party. He was the associate minister of mines from 2024 to 2025.

== Early life ==
Stephen John Crawford was born in Mississauga, Ontario, to his parents William and Diane Crawford. He grew up in Mississauga, the youngest of three children and attended Lorne Park Secondary School.

== Education and career ==
Crawford attended the University of Western Ontario where he completed his Bachelor of Arts degree in political science. He also holds a Business Diploma from the University of Toronto, and a Leadership Program Certificate from Queen's University. Crawford also earned his Chartered Investment Manager (CIM) designation.

Before entering politics, Crawford worked as a senior executive at Acuity Funds Ltd. Following Acuity's acquisition by AGF Management Ltd. in 2011, Crawford joined O'Leary Funds.

== Political career ==
In 2017, Crawford ran for the Ontario PC Party nomination in the riding of Oakville, defeating his opponents in the second round of voting. In the 2018 Ontario general election, Crawford ran against Liberal incumbent MPP, Kevin Flynn. Crawford defeated Flynn by 4,510 votes, ending his 15-year tenure as Oakville's MPP.

On August 9, 2018, Crawford was named the chair of the Finance and Economic Affairs Committee.

On November 21, 2018, Crawford announced his first private members bill, Bill 55, also known as the Safeguarding Our Information Act, 2018. In a 2018 editorial, he said the purpose of the bill was to prevent government institutions from accessing the private financial data of Ontario residents without their consent.

On June 26, 2019, Crawford was named the Parliamentary Assistant to the Minister of Infrastructure. He served in this role from 2019-2021.

On June 21, 2021, Crawford sent a letter to Oakville Mayor Rob Burton urging the town to request a Ministerial Zoning Order to protect Glen Abbey Golf Course from a proposed development. The development was cancelled in July 2021.

In July 2021, Crawford was appointed to the role of Parliamentary Assistant to the Minister of Energy, a position he held until 2022.

Crawford was re-elected in the 2022 election and, on June 29, 2022, he was sworn in as the Parliamentary Assistant to the Minister of Finance. On June 6, 2024, he became Associate Minister of Mines as part of Ontario's Ministry of Mines.

Crawford was again re-elected in the 2025 election, marking his third consecutive election victory. He was appointed Minister of Public and Business Service Delivery and Procurement on March 19, 2025.

== Personal life ==
Crawford resides in Oakville, Ontario with his wife and children.

== Awards and recognition ==
In 2019, Crawford and fellow MPP Effie Triantafilopoulos were presented with keys to the Town of Oakville "for their work on the regional review process and strong representation of the voice of Oakville residents".

In 2021, Crawford received a second key to the Town of Oakville, alongside Premier Doug Ford and fellow MPPs Triantafilopoulos and Steve Clark, for their role in saving the Glen Abbey Golf Course.

== Electoral record ==
2025 Ontario general election: Oakville
Party	Candidate	Votes	%	±%
Progressive Conservative	Stephen Crawford	22,755	48	+2.56
Liberal	Alison Gohel	20,906	44.1	+6.41
New Democratic	Diane Downey	1851	3.9	-2.87
Green	Bruno Sousa	1205	2.5	-2.69
New Blue	Shereen Di Vittorio	556	1.2	
Turnout		47,395		
Eligible voters				
Source: Elections Ontario

2022 Ontario general election: Oakville
Party	Candidate	Votes	%	±%	Expenditures
Progressive Conservative	Stephen Crawford	21,162	45.44	+1.77	$106,260
Liberal	Alison Gohel	17,554	37.69	+1.95	$109,579
New Democratic	Maeve McNaughton	3,154	6.77	–9.80	$4,422
Green	Bruno Sousa	2,416	5.19	+1.70	$3,834
None of the Above	Stephen Kenneth Crawford	846	1.82	N/A	$0
New Blue	Mark Fraser Platt	764	1.64	N/A	$0
Ontario Party	Alicia Bedford	497	1.07	N/A	none listed
Freedom	Silvio Ursomarzo	129	0.28	N/A	none listed
Moderate	Andrew Titov	47	0.10	N/A	none listed
Total valid votes		46,569	99.29	+0.86	
Total rejected, unmarked, and declined ballots		334	0.81	–0.86	
Turnout		46,903	50.29	–12.17	
Eligible voters		92,702			
Progressive Conservative hold		Swing		–0.09	
Source(s): "Summary of Valid Votes Cast for Each Candidate" (PDF). Elections Ontario. 2022. Archived from the original on May 18, 2023.; "Statistical Summary by Electoral District" (PDF). Elections Ontario. 2022. Archived from the original on May 21, 2023.

2018 Ontario general election: Oakville
Party	Candidate	Votes	%	±%
Progressive Conservative	Stephen Crawford	24,837	43.67	+5.90
Liberal	Kevin Flynn	20,327	35.74	−13.69
New Democratic	Lesley Sprague	9,424	16.57	+8.63
Green	Emily De Sousa	1,986	3.49	−0.31
Libertarian	Spencer Oklobdzija	297	0.52	−0.27
Total valid votes		56,871	100.0	
Source: Elections Ontario
