= Natalie Pierre =

Canadian politician

Natalie Pierre MPP
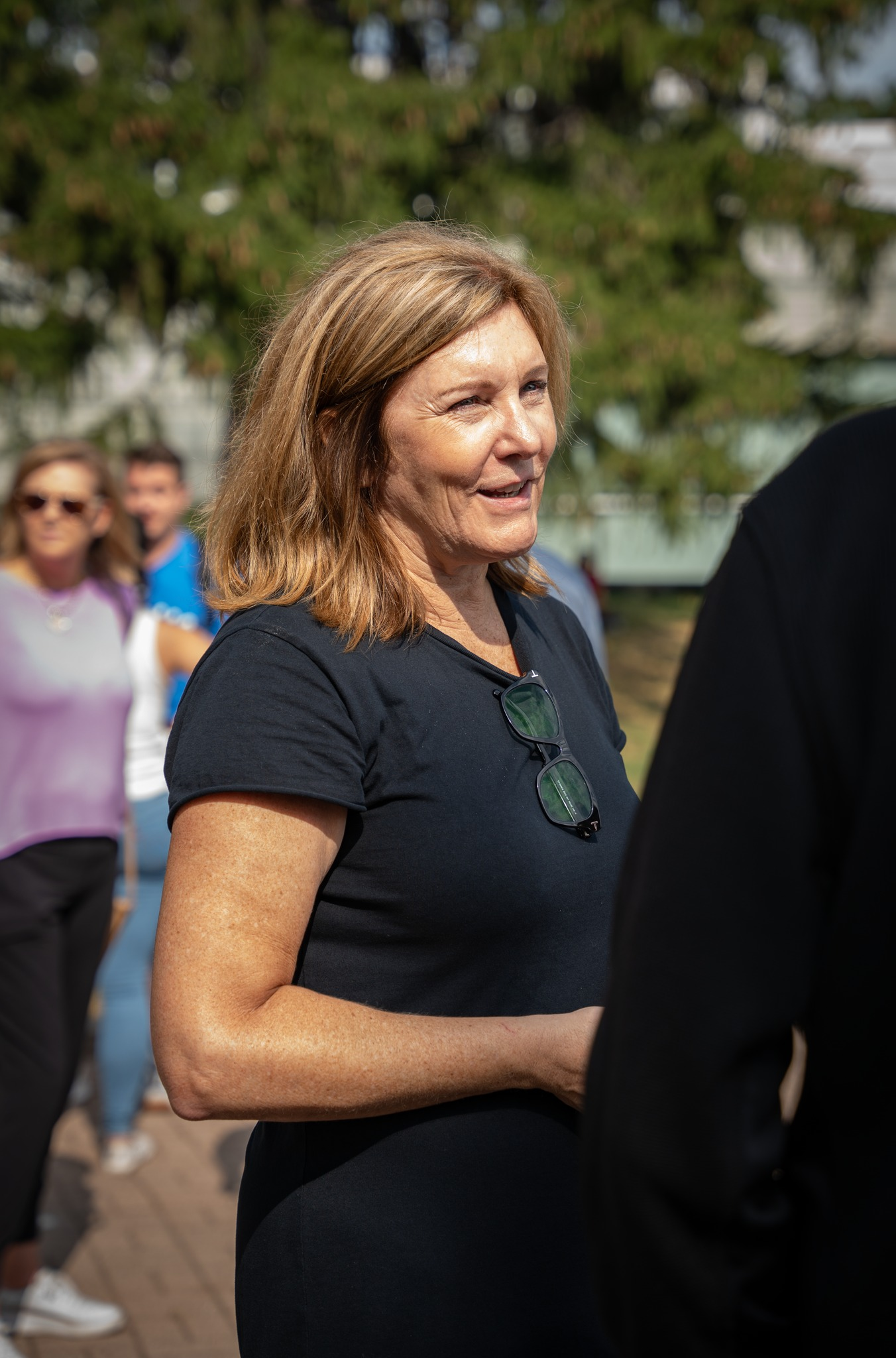
- Pierre in 2024

Member of the Ontario Provincial Parliament for Burlington
- Incumbent
- Assumed office June 2, 2022
- Preceded by: Jane McKenna

Personal details
- Party: Progressive Conservative

Natalie Pierre MPP is a Canadian politician, who was elected to the Legislative Assembly of Ontario in the 2022 provincial election. She represents the riding of Burlington as a member of the Progressive Conservative Party of Ontario.

She was appointed Parliamentary Assistant to the Minister of Colleges and Universities from July 2022 to March 2024. Currently, she serves as the Parliamentary Assistant to the Minister of Mental Health and Addictions, the Parliamentary Assistant to the Minister of Sport, and the Deputy Government Whip.

In addition to her parliamentary roles, Natalie sits on the Standing Committee on Social Policy at Queen’s Park.

On October 18, 2024, she initially announced she will not run for re-election in the 2025 Ontario general election. On December 21, 2024, Pierre changed her mind and announced that she will run for re-election.

== Electoral history ==
2025 Ontario general election: Burlington
Party	Candidate	Votes	%	±%
Progressive Conservative	Natalie Pierre	24,118	43.14	+0.59
Liberal	Andrea Grebenc	24,079	43.07	+13.65
New Democratic	Megan Beauchemin	4,487	8.03	–9.61
Green	Kyle Hutton	1,913	3.42	–3.27
New Blue	James Chilli Chillingworth	727	1.30	–1.19
None of the Above	David Crombie	582	1.04	N/A
Total valid votes/expense limit		55,906	99.29	–0.20
Total rejected, unmarked, and declined ballots		401	0.71	+0.20
Turnout		56,307	53.71	+2.08
Eligible voters		104,829		
Progressive Conservative hold		Swing		–6.53
Source: Elections Ontario

2022 Ontario general election: Burlington
Party	Candidate	Votes	%	±%	Expenditures
Progressive Conservative	Natalie Pierre	22,348	42.55	+2.10	$28,540
Liberal	Mariam Manaa	15,452	29.42	+4.82	$64,316
New Democratic	Andrew Drummond	9,262	17.64	−11.00	$52,926
Green	Kyle Hutton	3,515	6.69	+2.21	$7,024
New Blue	Allison Mckenzie	1,310	2.49		$6,621
Ontario Party	Sebastian Aldea	633	1.21		$0
Total valid votes/expense limit		52,520	99.49	+0.56	$143,149
Total rejected, unmarked, and declined ballots		269	0.51	-0.56	
Turnout		52,789	51.63	-11.82	
Eligible voters		102,230			
Progressive Conservative hold		Swing		−1.36	
Source(s): "Summary of Valid Votes Cast for Each Candidate" (PDF). Elections Ontario. 2022. Archived from the original on May 18, 2023.; "Statistical Summary by Electoral District" (PDF). Elections Ontario. 2022. Archived from the original on May 21, 2023.
