= Eleanor McMahon =

Canadian politician

The Honourable Eleanor McMahon ECO
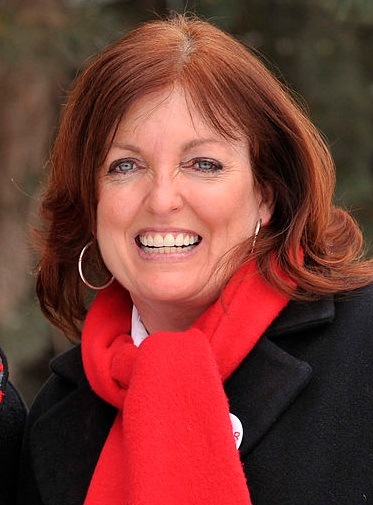

Member of the Ontario Provincial Parliament for Burlington
- In office June 12, 2014 – June 7, 2018
- Preceded by: Jane McKenna
- Succeeded by: Jane McKenna

Personal details
- Born: Mary Eleanor McMahon; 1962 (age 63–64) Windsor, Ontario, Canada
- Party: Ontario Liberal
- Spouse: Greg Stobbart (m. 2002; died 2006)
- Education: University of Windsor
- Occupation: Non-profit director

Mary Eleanor McMahon ECO (born c. 1962) is a Canadian politician in Ontario, Canada. She was a Liberal member of the Legislative Assembly of Ontario from 2014 to 2018 who represented the riding of Burlington. She served in the cabinet of the government of Kathleen Wynne. She is the founder of the Share the Road Cycling Coalition, an urban transportation policy and advocacy group she created following the death of her husband OPP Sergeant Greg Stobbart, in a collision in June 2006.

== Background ==
McMahon was born and raised in Windsor, Ontario. She was employed on Parliament Hill as press secretary successively for Herb Gray, John Turner and Jean Chrétien. Other roles included director of public affairs at the Canadian Advisory Council on the Status of Women, vice president at the Canadian Chamber of Commerce, director of public affairs at Petro-Canada, director, Public Affairs Sustainable Development Technology Canada, vice president at United Way Ottawa, and executive director of public affairs at the Ontario Medical Association.

== Cycling advocate ==
After her husband was killed by a driver with a suspended licence in 2006, McMahon founded the Share the Road Cycling Coalition. Her husband was training for a triathlon at the time of his death, and was cycling on Tremaine Road in Milton. She pressed the government to amend the Highway Traffic Act to toughen the law regarding drivers who drive with suspended licences. The amendment, known as Greg's Law was passed in April 2009. In 2010, Share the Road released a policy Green Paper (When Ontario Bikes, Ontario Benefits) in order to advise the Government of Ontario on how best to proceed with much needed policy changes and strategy bicycle strategy and made an evidence-based case for infrastructure funding, education, legislative change and highlighted opportunities including bicycle travel and route development. In 2012, she successfully called for a provincial Coroner's Review into Cycling Deaths in Ontario, and sat as a member of the Review Team. Central to that review was the call for the province to release a Provincial Cycling Policy and in 2013, working with Transportation Minister Glen Murray together they released the first Ontario Cycling Strategy in 20 years — CycleON. In April 2014 McMahon again joined Murray in the announcement of $25 million government investment strategy in cycling infrastructure. In 2015, Ontario passed a one-metre safe passing law as part of Bill 31, becoming the second province in Canada to do so. McMahon had advocated for the law prior to her election.

In 2017 as Minister of Tourism Culture and Sport McMahon announced two important cycling related policies. The first, $100 M in cycling infrastructure funding in municipalities across Ontario, represented the single greatest investment in cycling in Ontario's history. The other, was an important legislative change stemming from the collision that took McMahon's husband's life in 2006. McMahon led the passage of two important amendments to the Highway Traffic Act, stemming from a Private Member's Bill she tabled in 2016. These amendments — Careless Driving Cause Death, and Careless Driving Cause Bodily Harm created the toughest penalties for Careless Driving in Canada. In addition, the legislative change resulted in, for the first time, road user vulnerability being taken into consideration at sentencing. If a motorist is convicted of Careless Driving involving a pedestrian or cyclist, the penalties are enhanced due to their vulnerability.

This legislation is the first of its kind in Canada.

== Politics ==
On January 30, 2014, McMahon was nominated as the Liberal candidate for the riding of Burlington. On June 12, 2014, she defeated Progressive Conservative incumbent Jane McKenna by 3,507 votes.

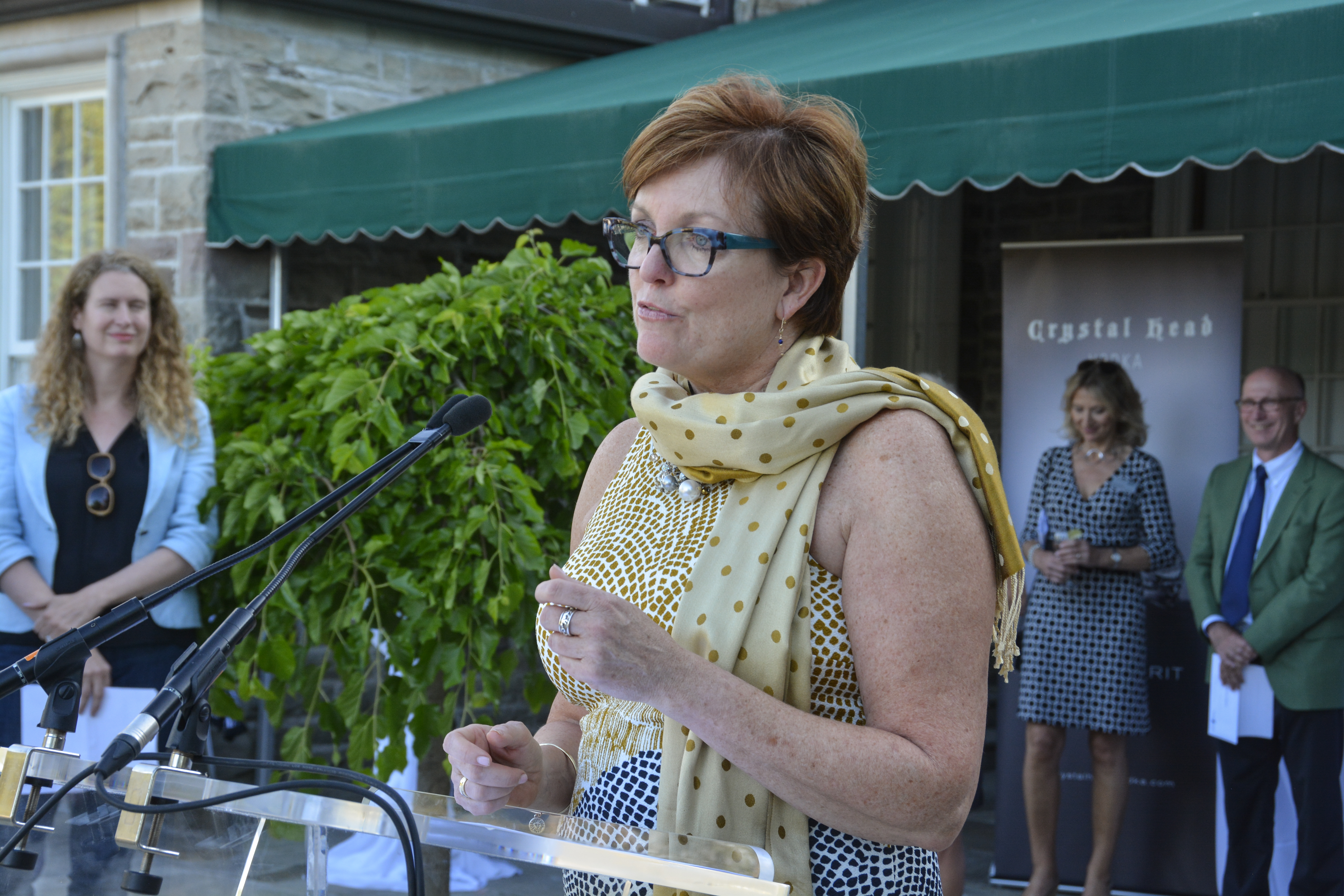
Eleanor McMahon, Ontario Minister of Tourism, Culture and Sport in June 2016. Photo: David Lee

In June 2016 she was named to the provincial cabinet as Minister of Tourism, Culture and Sport. She previously served as parliamentary assistant to the Minister of Natural Resources and Forestry.

=== Cabinet positions ===
Wynne ministry, Province of Ontario (2013–2018)
Cabinet posts (2)
| Predecessor | Office | Successor |
|---|---|---|
| Liz Sandals | President of the Treasury Board; 2018 (January–June); Also Responsible for Digital Government | Peter Bethlenfalvy |
| Michael Coteau | Minister of Tourism, Culture and Sport; 2016–2018 | Daiene Vernile |
