= Terry O'Connor (politician) =

Canadian politician

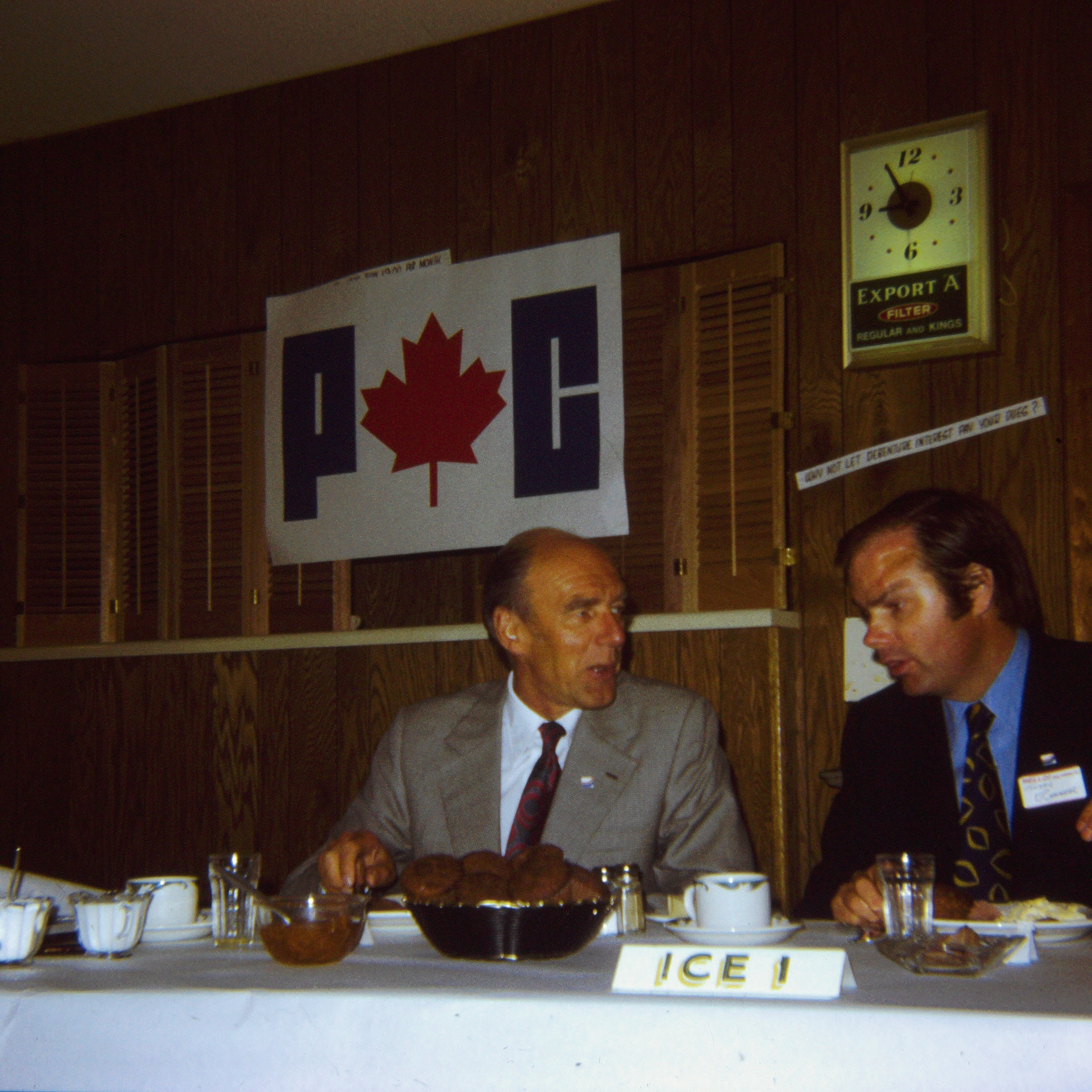
- O'Connor and Robert Stanfield at a 1972 community breakfast in Acton, Ontario

Ontario MPP
- In office 1985–1987
- Preceded by: James Snow
- Succeeded by: Doug Carrothers
- Constituency: Oakville

Member of Parliament for Halton
- In office 1972–1974
- Preceded by: Rud L. Whiting
- Succeeded by: Frank Philbrook

Personal details
- Born: March 24, 1940 (age 86) Toronto, Ontario
- Party: PC (Canada), 1972-1974; PC (Ontario), 1985-1987
- Education: University of Western Ontario
- Profession: Lawyer

Terrance Patrick O'Connor, QC (born March 24, 1940) is a former politician in Ontario, Canada. He served in the House of Commons of Canada from 1972 to 1974, and in the Legislative Assembly of Ontario from 1985 to 1987. O'Connor was a member of the Progressive Conservative Party. From 1993 to 2015 he was a judge of the Ontario Superior Court of Justice.

== Background ==
O'Connor was born in Toronto, and graduated with a Bachelor of Laws degree from the University of Western Ontario. He was called to the bar in 1966. He served as executive assistant to Attorney General of Ontario Allan Lawrence.

== Politics ==
O'Connor was elected to the Canadian House of Commons in the 1972 federal election, defeating Liberal incumbent Rud Whiting by 2,221 votes in Halton. The election was won by the Liberals under Pierre Trudeau, and O'Connor served as an opposition member for two years. He lost to Liberal Frank Philbrook by 1,911 votes in the 1974 election.

Eleven years later, O'Connor was elected to the Ontario legislature in the 1985 provincial election, defeating Liberal candidate Doug Carrothers by 687 votes in Oakville. The Progressive Conservative Party of Ontario won a narrow minority government in this election under Frank Miller's leadership, and was soon defeated in the legislature. In opposition, O'Connor served as his party's critic for Justice and the Attorney General. He was defeated in the 1987 election, losing to Doug Carrothers by 1,291 votes.

=== Federal (Halton) ===
1972 Canadian federal election
| Party | Candidate | Votes | % | ±% |
|---|---|---|---|---|
| Progressive Conservative | Terry O'Connor | 22,640 | 43.7 | +9.7 |
| Liberal | Rud L. Whiting | 20,419 | 39.4 | -8.7 |
| New Democratic | Carolyn Holstein | 8,725 | 16.8 | -1.0 |
| Total valid votes | | 51,784 | 100.0 | |

1974 Canadian federal election
| Party | Candidate | Votes | % | ±% |
|---|---|---|---|---|
| Liberal | Frank Philbrook | 23,520 | 45.2 | +5.8 |
| Progressive Conservative | Terry O'Connor | 21,609 | 41.5 | -2.2 |
| New Democratic | Archibald Brown | 6,887 | 13.2 | -3.6 |
| Total valid votes | | 52,016 | 100.0 | |

=== Ontario (Oakville South) ===
1985 Ontario general election
| Party | Candidate | Votes | % | ±% |
|---|---|---|---|---|
| Progressive Conservative | Terry O'Connor | 14,265 | 41.7 | |
| Liberal | Doug Carrothers | 13,578 | 39.6 | |
| New Democratic | Kevin Flynn | 4,390 | 12.8 | |
| Green | Chris Kowalchuk | 2,008 | 5.9 | |
| Total valid votes | | 34,241 | 100.0 | |

1987 Ontario general election
| Party | Candidate | Votes | % | ±% |
|---|---|---|---|---|
| Liberal | Doug Carrothers | 13,241 | 44.7 | +5.1 |
| Progressive Conservative | Terry O'Connor | 11,950 | 40.3 | -1.4 |
| New Democratic | Tim Cooper | 3,080 | 10.4 | -2.4 |
| Green | Chris Kowalchuk | 1,357 | 4.6 | -1.3 |
| Total valid votes | | 29,628 | 100.0 | |

== Judicial record ==
In 1993, O'Connor was appointed a judge of the Ontario Superior Court of Justice. In 1997 he was appointed as a Deputy Judge of the Supreme Court of the Northwest Territories and the Nunavut Court of Justice. He retired in 2015 at the age of 75.
