= Halton East (provincial electoral district) =

Former provincial electoral district in Ontario, Canada

Ontario electoral district

Defunct provincial electoral district
- Legislature: Legislative Assembly of Ontario
- District created: 1967
- District abolished: 1975
- First contested: 1967
- Last contested: 1971

Halton East was a provincial electoral district in Ontario, Canada. It existed from 1967 to 1975, when it was abolished alongside Halton West when the riding was redistributed to Halton—Burlington, Oakville and Mississauga North. It consisted of the eastern parts of Halton County.

== History ==
In its history it was represented by Progressive Conservative James Snow.

== Members ==
Halton East
Assembly	Years	Member	Party
Riding created out of Halton
28th	1967–1971	James Snow	Progressive Conservative
29th	1971–1975	James Snow	Progressive Conservative
Riding dissolved into Halton—Burlington, Oakville and Mississauga North

== Electoral history ==
1971 Ontario general election
Party	Candidate	Votes	%	±%
Progressive Conservative	James Snow	21,359	55.43	+17.38
Liberal	Bob Blake	9,737	25.27	–12.15
New Democratic	Kenneth A. Gelok	7,154	18.57	–5.96
Independent	Richard McGrath	284	0.74	–
Total valid votes		38,534	99.62	
Total rejected ballots		148	0.38	–0.09
Turnout		38,682	75.07	+8.20
Eligible voters		51,531		
Progressive Conservative hold		Swing		+14.76
Source: Elections Ontario

1967 Ontario general election
Party	Candidate	Votes	%
Progressive Conservative	James Snow	9,867	38.05
Liberal	Robin Skuce	9,703	37.42
New Democratic	William Duncan Gillies	6,359	24.52
Total valid votes		25,929	99.53
Total rejected ballots		122	0.47
Turnout		26,051	66.87
Eligible voters		38,958	
Progressive Conservative pickup new district.			
Source: Elections Ontario

== See also ==
- List of Ontario provincial electoral districts
- Canadian provincial electoral districts
