= Joyce Savoline =

Canadian politician (born c.1946)

Ontario MPP
- In office 2007–2011
- Preceded by: Cam Jackson
- Succeeded by: Jane McKenna
- Constituency: Burlington

Personal details
- Born: Joyce Davies; 1946 (age 79–80) Shanghai, China
- Party: Progressive Conservative

Joyce Savoline (born c. 1946) is a former politician in Ontario, Canada. She was a Progressive Conservative member of the Legislative Assembly of Ontario representing the riding of Burlington from 2007 to 2011.

== Background ==
Savoline was born in Shanghai, China and moved to Canada with her parents and sister in 1953. She and her husband moved to Burlington, Ontario in 1973. Savoline Boulevard in Milton, Ontario is named after the former Chair of Halton Region.

== Politics ==
Savoline served as chair of the Regional Municipality of Halton from her original appointment in 1994 until her retirement in 2006. In 2000, as a result of changes to the Ontario Municipal Act, she became the first person to be directly elected to that position by the voters of Halton. She was reelected in 2003.

Following her departure from municipal office, Savoline sought the Progressive Conservative nomination to replace Cam Jackson as Member of Provincial Parliament from Burlington, after Jackson resigned to run for mayor. At the local party's nomination meeting on 14 December 2006, she narrowly defeated former Miss Canada Blair Lancaster, 251 votes to 205. Brad Reaume, a former journalist and assistant to Halton MPP Ted Chudleigh, was also a candidate.

In the ensuing by-election, Savoline faced several opponents, but her closest competition was Liberal candidate Joan Lougheed, a former long-time Burlington city councillor who had narrowly lost to Jackson in the Burlington mayoral race the previous fall. She defeated Lougheed with 11,143 votes (49%) to her 9,365 (41.2%) according to unofficial election night tallies.

Savoline was re-elected in the 2007 Ontario provincial election defeating Liberal candidate Marianne Meed Ward by a narrower margin of 21,517 votes (41.3%) to 19,693 votes (37.8%). She did not contest the riding in 2011.

== Electoral record ==
Ontario provincial by-election, February 8, 2007: Burlington
Party	Candidate	Votes	%	±%
Progressive Conservative	Joyce Savoline	11,143	49.0%	+2.8
Liberal	Joan Lougheed	9,365	41.2%	−1.0
New Democratic	Cory Judson	1,310	5.8%	−1.4
Green	Frank de Jong	734	3.2%	0.9
Freedom	Barry Spruce	106	0.5%	–
Independent	John Turmel	90	0.4%	–

2007 Ontario general election
Party	Candidate	Votes	%	±%
Progressive Conservative	Joyce Savoline	21,517	41.3	
Liberal	Marianne Meed Ward	19,693	37.8	
New Democratic	Cory Judson	5,731	11.0	
Green	Tim Wilson	4,750	9.1	
Family Coalition	Mark Gamez	395	0.8	
