= Gary Carr (politician) =

Canadian politician (born 1955)

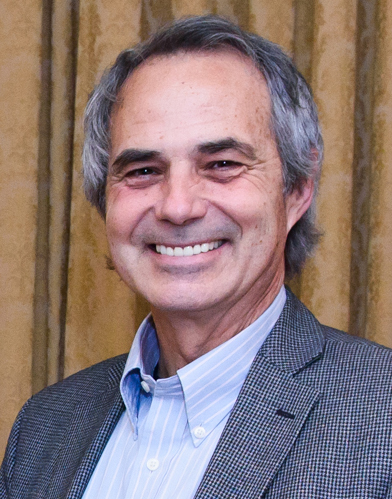
- Carr in 2016

Halton Regional Chair
- Incumbent
- Assumed office December 6, 2006
- Preceded by: Joyce Savoline

37th Speaker of the Legislative Assembly of Ontario
- In office October 20, 1999 – November 19, 2003
- Preceded by: Chris Stockwell
- Succeeded by: Alvin Curling

Member of Parliament for Halton
- In office June 28, 2004 – January 23, 2006
- Preceded by: Julian Reed
- Succeeded by: Garth Turner

Member of the Ontario Provincial Parliament for Oakville (Oakville South; 1990–1999)
- In office September 6, 1990 – October 2, 2003
- Preceded by: Doug Carrothers
- Succeeded by: Kevin Flynn

Personal details
- Born: August 14, 1955 (age 71) Toronto, Ontario, Canada
- Party: Progressive Conservative (1990-2003); Liberal (2004-2006)
- Profession: Businessman
Ice hockey career
- Height: 6 ft 2 in (188 cm)
- Weight: 195 lb (88 kg; 13 st 13 lb)
- Position: Goaltender
- Caught: Left
- NHL draft: 122nd overall, 1975; Boston Bruins
- WHA draft: 89th overall, 1975; Cincinnati Stingers
- Playing career: 1973–1982

Gary Carr (born August 14, 1955) is a Canadian politician in Ontario, Canada. He served as a Progressive Conservative member of the Legislative Assembly of Ontario from 1990 to 2003, and served in the House of Commons of Canada as a Liberal from 2004 to early 2006. Gary Carr is currently the Chair of the Regional Municipality of Halton.

== Background ==
Carr has a certificate in Business Administration from Ryerson University, and was a businessman and sales manager in the transportation industry before entering public life. He continued his education as a politician, and received an MBA from Athabasca University in 2002. Carr also played professional ice hockey for five years in the farm teams of the Boston Bruins and Quebec Nordiques. In 1975, he was a Memorial Cup champion as a member of the Toronto Marlboros.

== Provincial politics ==
Carr was first elected to the Ontario legislature in the provincial election of 1990, defeating incumbent Liberal Doug Carrothers by 108 votes in the riding of Oakville South. From 1993 to 1995, he was his party's Deputy House Leader.

The Progressive Conservatives won a majority government under Mike Harris in the provincial election of 1995, and Carr was easily re-elected. He was appointed as a parliamentary assistant to the Solicitor-General for the entire term.

Carr was again re-elected in the provincial election of 1999, defeating Liberal Kevin Flynn by over 13,000 votes. He was chosen as Speaker of the legislature on October 20, 1999, and held this position for the entirety of the parliament which followed.

Like his predecessor Chris Stockwell, Carr was known as an impartial Speaker who was willing to criticize his own government. In 2003, he alienated several members of the Progressive Conservative Party by ruling that the government of Ernie Eves had committed a prima facie act of contempt against the legislature by holding its budget announcement at the headquarters of Magna International, rather than in the legislature itself. He was critical of the direction taken by the Progressive Conservative Party in this period, and did not seek re-election in 2003. He left politics and briefly coached the London Racers hockey team in London, England.

== Federal politics ==
In 2004 Carr was recruited to run as a Liberal in the riding of Halton, which bordered his old provincial riding. He defeated Conservative candidate Dean Martin in the election. Carr was defeated in the 2006 election by Conservative challenger Garth Turner.

== Halton regional chair ==
Gary Carr was elected as Chair of Halton Region on November 13, 2006. Carr overwhelmingly defeated former Halton Region CAO Brent Marshall, who resigned from his position as CAO to run against Carr. Carr was sworn in as the Regional Chairman on December 6, 2006.
