= Doug Carrothers =

Canadian politician

Ontario MPP
- In office 1987–1990
- Preceded by: Terry O'Connor
- Succeeded by: Gary Carr
- Constituency: Oakville South

Personal details
- Born: November 21, 1950 (age 75) North Vancouver, British Columbia
- Party: Liberal
- Profession: Lawyer

Douglas Alexander Carrothers (born November 21, 1950) is a former politician in Ontario, Canada. He was a Liberal member of the Legislative Assembly of Ontario from 1987 to 1990 who represented the GTA riding of Oakville South.

== Background ==
Carrothers was educated at York University and the Osgoode Hall Law School. He has both a law degree and an M.B.A. A practicing lawyer, he is a member of the Law Society of Upper Canada and the Canadian Club of Oakville.

== Politics ==
He ran for the Ontario legislature in the 1985 provincial election, but lost to Progressive Conservative Terry O'Connor by 687 votes in the constituency of Oakville. He ran again in the 1987 election, and defeated O'Connor by 1,291 votes in the redistributed constituency of Oakville South. For the next three years, Carrothers served as a backbench supporter of David Peterson's government. In 1989 he was appointed as Parliamentary Assistant to the Minister of Industry, Trade and Technology.

The Liberals were upset by the NDP in the 1990 provincial election, and Carrothers lost his riding to Gary Carr of the Progressive Conservatives by 108 votes.
