= Regional Municipality of Halton =

Regional municipality in Ontario, Canada

Halton Region
- Regional municipality (upper-tier)
- Regional Municipality of Halton
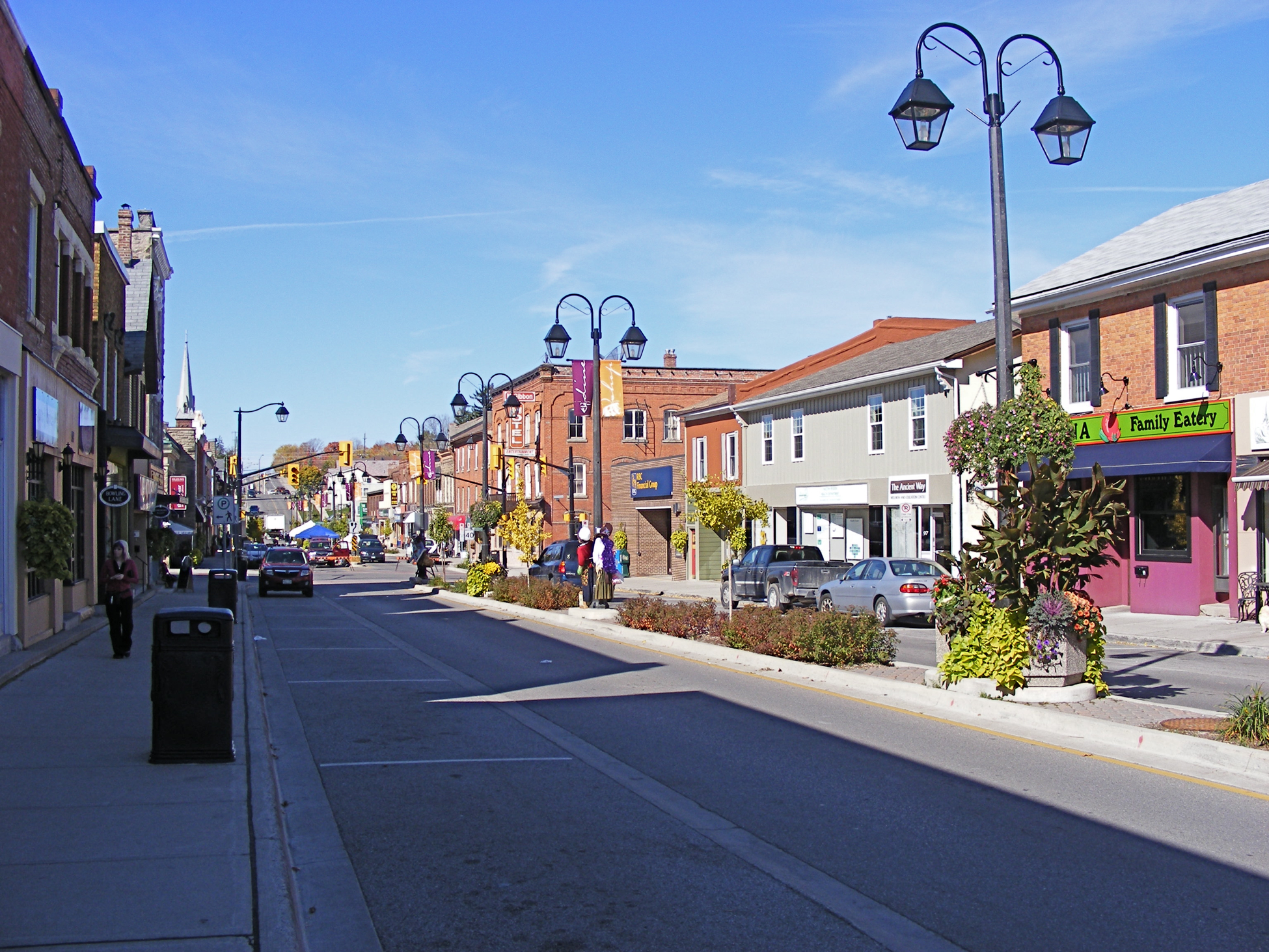
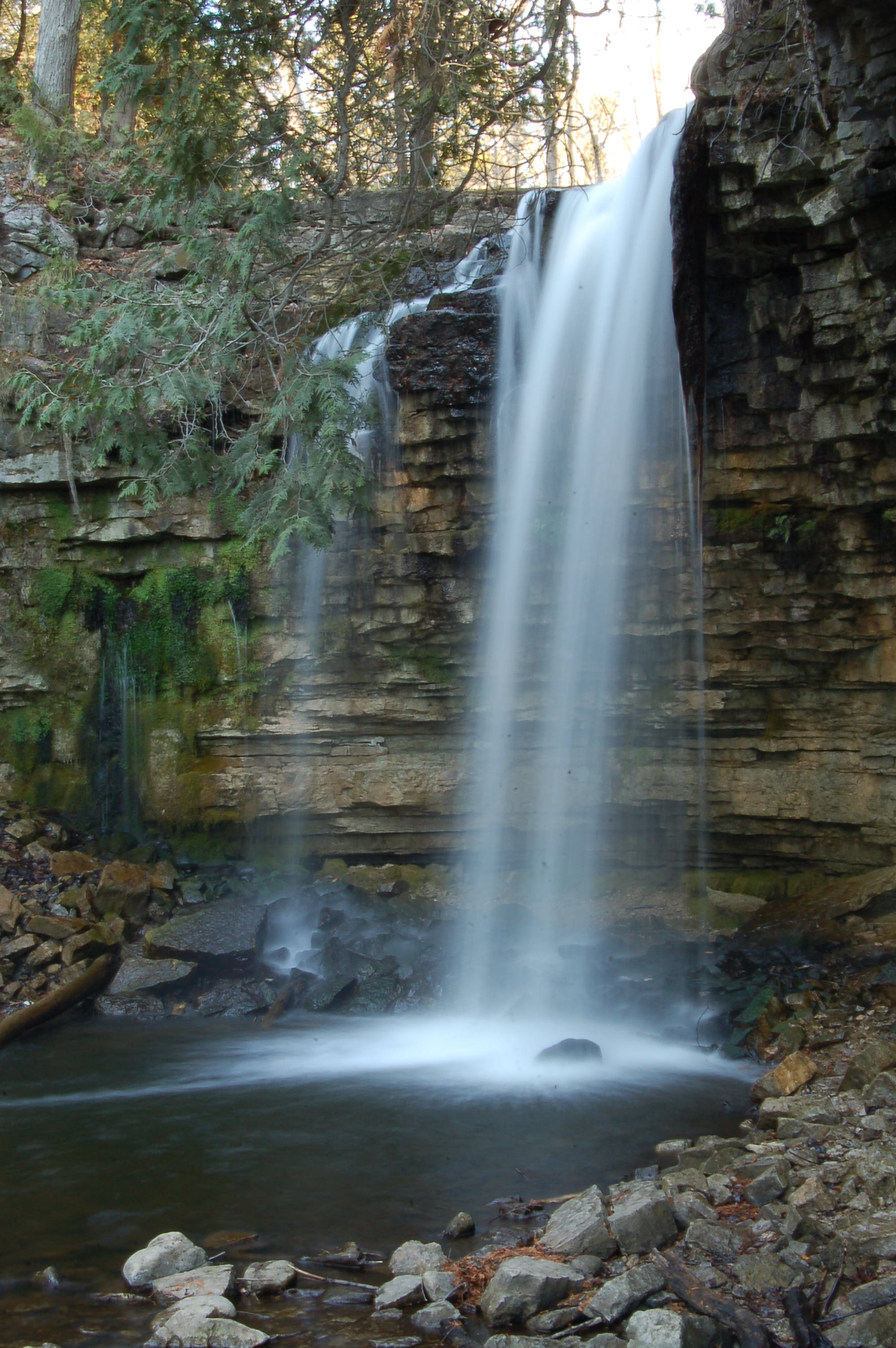
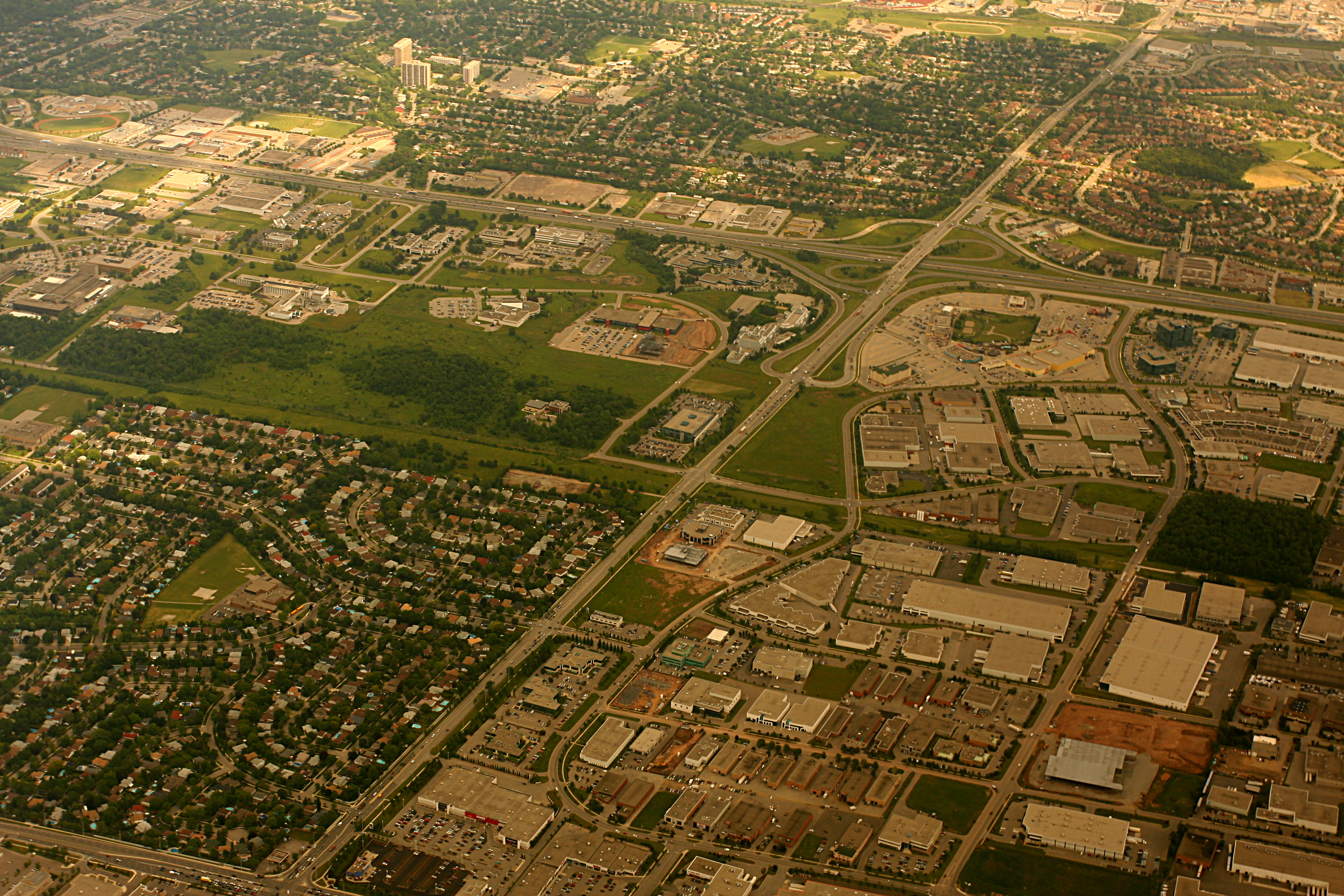
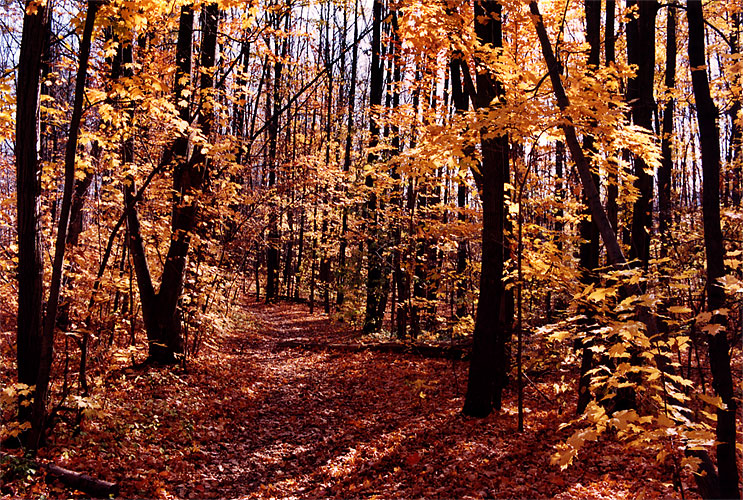
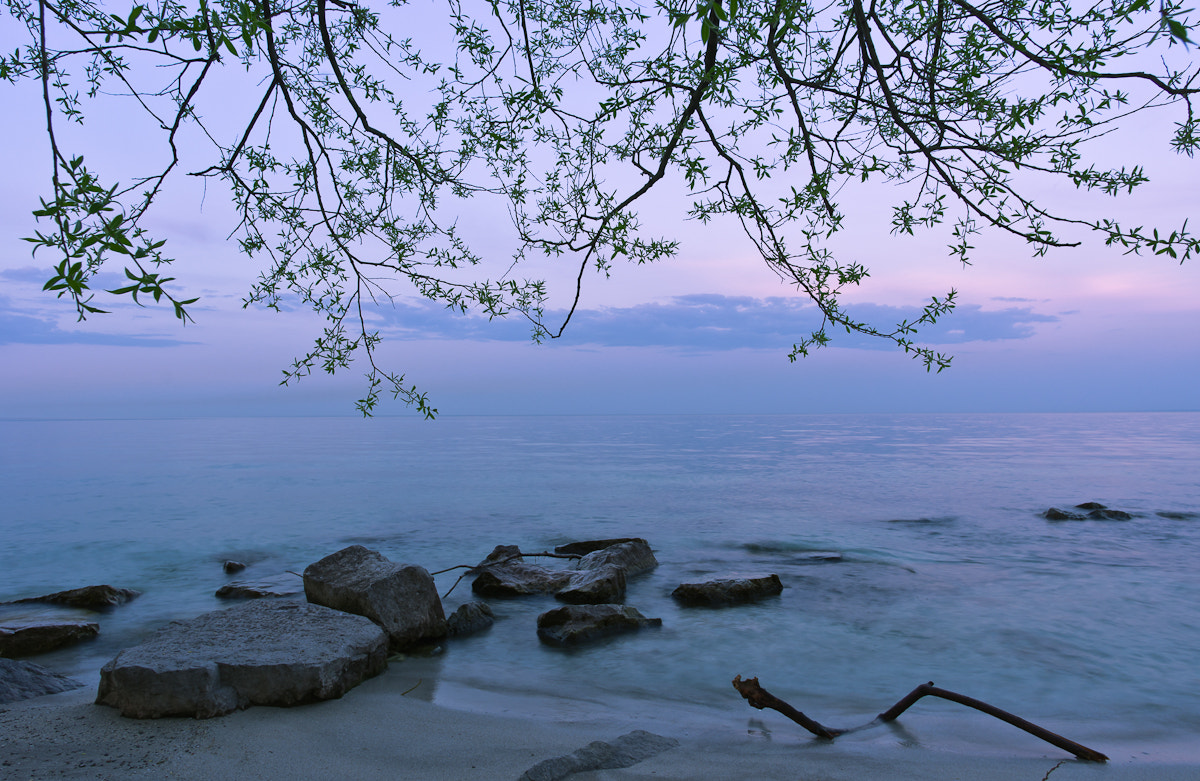
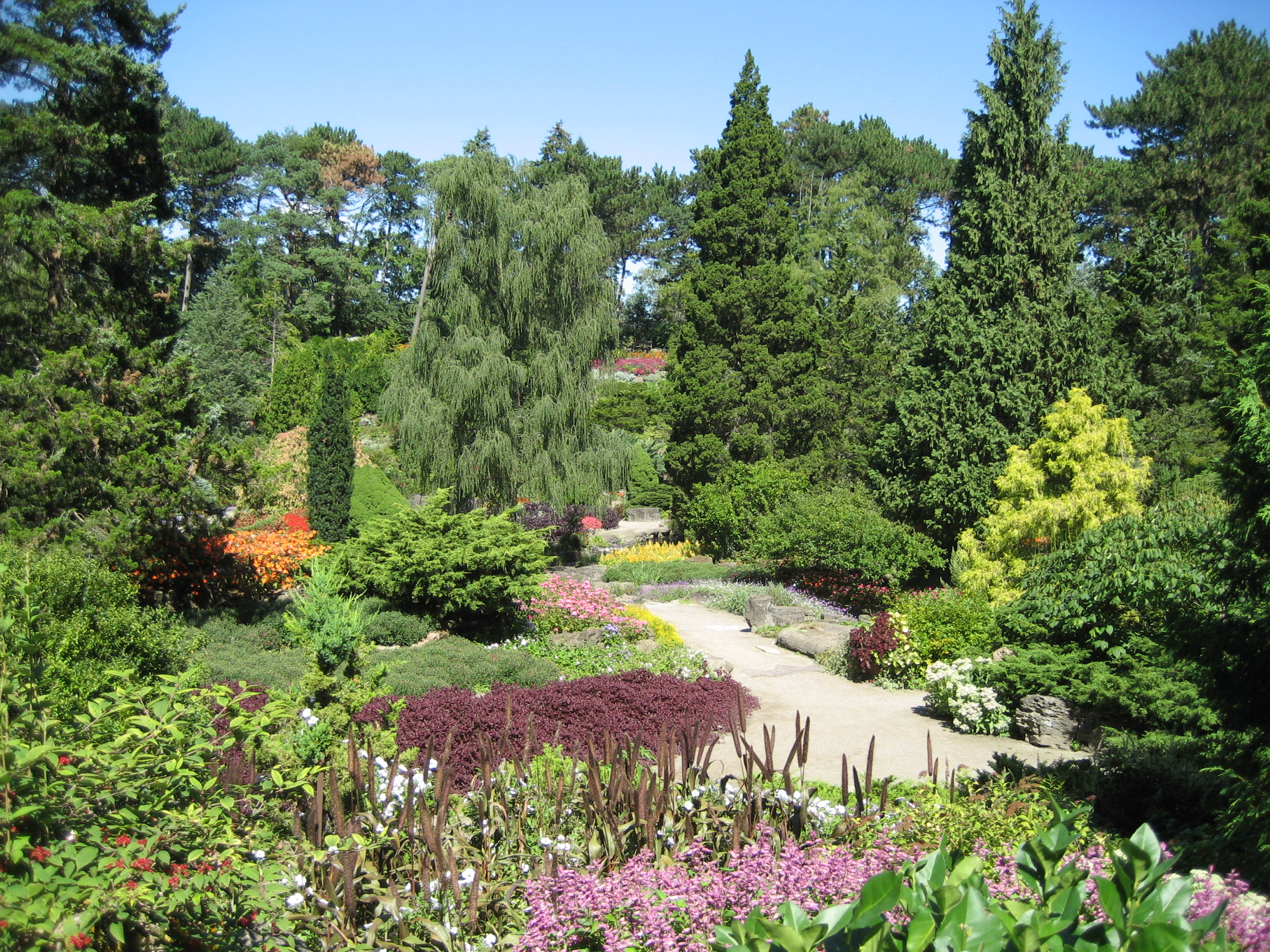
- Clockwise from top left: Georgetown, Hilton Falls, Bruce Trail, Royal Botanical Gardens, Beachway Park, Oakville

- Flag Coat of arms Logo
- Motto: Absque labore nihil (Latin for: Nothing without effort)

- Halton Region's location within Ontario
- Coordinates: 43°30′30″N 79°53′16″W
- Country: Canada
- Province: Ontario
- Established (county): 1854
- Established (regional municipality): 1974
- Seat: Oakville

Government
  - Regional Chair: Gary Carr

Area
  - Land: 965.71 km^{2} (372.86 sq mi)

Population (2021)
  - Total: 596,637
  - Density: 617.8/km^{2} (1,600/sq mi)
- Time zone: UTC−05:00 (EST)
  - Summer (DST): UTC−04:00 (EDT)
- Postal code prefix: L
- Website: www.halton.ca

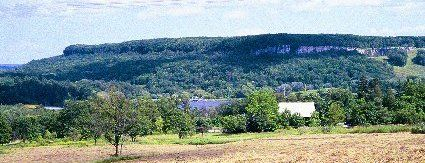
Rattlesnake Point, near Milton, Ontario.

The Regional Municipality of Halton (/ˈhɑːl.tʌn/), or Halton Region, is a regional municipality in Ontario, Canada, located in the Golden Horseshoe of Southern Ontario. It comprises the city of Burlington and the towns of Oakville, Milton, and Halton Hills. Policing in the Region is provided by the Halton Regional Police Service. The regional council's headquarters are located in Oakville. Burlington, Oakville, and Milton are largely urban and suburban, while Halton Hills is more rural.

Halton is part of the Greater Toronto Area (GTA), although it is the only regional municipality in the GTA that is not situated directly adjacent to Toronto's city proper. However, the region is split between the census metropolitan areas (CMAs) of Toronto and Hamilton. Burlington is part of the Hamilton CMA, while the rest of the region is part of the Toronto CMA.

Halton experienced a growth rate of 17.1% between 2001 and 2006, and 14.2% between 2006 and 2011, giving it one of the highest growth rates in the country. Despite the unprecedented growth in residential development, agriculture and protected lands along the Niagara Escarpment are still the predominant land uses in the region. Halton has been ranked by Maclean's national crime ranking report as being the "safest place to live" in the GTA and one of the top five in Canada.

== History ==
The Regional Municipality of Halton was established on 1 January 1974 as the successor to the former Halton County by the Regional Municipality of Halton Act, 1973. From 1 January 2003, it has been governed by the Municipal Act.

=== Regional Chair ===
The Regional Municipality of Halton Act specifically provided for the appointment of the first regional chair to hold office until 1976, and for the regional council to elect regional chairman at the start of 1977 and every two year thereafter. The regional council may, but is not required to, elect one of its members as chairman. If a member of the regional council is elected, they relinquish the seat and whatever elected office they held at their constituent municipality.

In January 1977, Halton Hills Reeve Rick Morrow defeated incumbent Alan Masson to become the first elected chair of Halton. He served only one term and was succeeded by Burlington councillor Jack Raftis at the start of 1979. Raftis served until 1984, and stood down after he and wife were ensnared by a region wide investigation and were charged for bribery. Another Halton Hills mayor Pete Pomeroy succeeded him and served for ten years.

From 2000 until 2026, the regional chair were elected directly by the four constituent municipalities. Joyce Savoline, who was elected by her peers as chair at the start of 1995 while a Burlington councillor, became the first regional chair directly elected by voters in 2000, and was re-elected in 2003. Savoline stood down in 2006 and was succeeded by former Speaker of the Legislative Assembly Gary Carr, who was elected to the role in five consecutive municipal elections starting in 2006.

Halton Regional Chair
Council term	Regional chair	Notes	Selection
1974–76	Alan Masson	Former Oakville Reeve	appointed by Ontario
1976–78	Richard “Ric” Blair Morrow	Georgetown/Halton Hills Reeve	elected by regional council
1978–80	Jack Raftis	Burlington councillor	elected by regional council
1980–82	Jack Raftis		elected by regional council
1982–85	Jack Raftis		elected by regional council
1982–85	Pete Pomeroy	Halton Hills mayor	elected by regional council
1985–88	Pete Pomeroy		elected by regional council
1988–91	Pete Pomeroy		elected by regional council
1991–94	Pete Pomeroy		elected by regional council
1994–97	Joyce Savoline	Burlington councillor since 1982	elected by regional council
1997–00	Joyce Savoline		elected by regional council
2000–03	Joyce Savoline	First directly elected term	direct election
2003–06	Joyce Savoline		direct election
2006–10	Gary Carr	PC MPP for Oakville 1990–2003 and Liberal MP for Halton 2004–06	direct election
2010–14	Gary Carr	PC MPP for Oakville 1990–2003 and Liberal MP for Halton 2004–06	direct election
2014–18	Gary Carr		direct election
2018–22	Gary Carr		direct election
2022–26	Gary Carr		direct election
2026–30	Ann Mulvale	Oakville mayor 1988–2006	appointed by Ontario

== Regional council ==
The council consists of the elected chairperson, the mayors of the local municipalities, and regional councillors elected by wards from the local municipalities (who also sit on their respective municipal councils).

The current membership of the council is as follows:

Municipality	Chairperson	Mayor	Regional councillors
City of Burlington	Gary Carr	Marianne Meed Ward	Kelvin Galbraith; Lisa Kearns; Rory Nisan; Shawna Stolte; Paul Sharman; Angelo Bentivegna
Town of Oakville	Gary Carr	Rob Burton	Sean O'Meara; Cathy Duddeck; Dave Gittings; Allan Elgar; Jeff Knoll; Tom Adams; Pavan Parmar
Town of Milton	Gary Carr	Gordon Krantz	Colin Best; Rick Malboeuf; Mike Cluett; Zeeshan Hamid
Town of Halton Hills	Gary Carr	Ann Lawlor	Jane Fogal; Clark Somerville

== Regional services ==
Halton Region provides the following services to its communities:

- Economic development
- Emergency planning
- Regional planning and growth management
- Recycling and waste
- Regional roads
- Sewage (wastewater) collection systems and treatment plants
- Water purification plants and distribution systems
- Housing supports and services
- Children and parenting
- Employment and financial assistance
- Ontario Works (social services)
- Services for seniors
- Paramedic services
- Public health
- Immunizations and preventable diseases
- Food safety
- Halton Regional Police Service

In 2018, the Region had 27 emergency vehicles and 254 paramedics; the latter answered 53,094 paramedic calls. The Police service had 721 police officers; its 911 call centre received 121,971 reports of emergency.

== Fraud and corruption cases ==
Between 2016 and 2019, several high-ranking employees in Halton Region's water and wastewater division were convicted in two major fraud and corruption schemes that cost the municipality millions of dollars.

=== David Ohashi case ===
In January 2016, David Ohashi, the former manager of Plant Capital and Engineering, was dismissed following an internal investigation into irregular bidding processes. In 2019, Ohashi was convicted of fraud over $5,000 and uttering a forged document. The investigation revealed that between 2010 and 2016, Ohashi provided confidential bidding information to specific contractors in exchange for personal benefits, including travel and luxury items. While the jury found him guilty of fraud, the presiding judge later noted there was no proof of direct financial gain for Ohashi personally, leading to a suspended sentence and 18 months of probation.

=== Nicolas Rewa and Sirron Systems ===
A second, larger investigation began in 2015 involving Nicolas Rewa, the region's former Public Works Manager. Rewa was found to have defrauded the Region of approximately $770,000 between 2008 and 2017 by awarding service contracts to Hamilton-based Sirron Systems Inc. for non-existent supplies and labour. In 2018, Rewa pleaded guilty to fraud-related charges and was sentenced to three years in prison. He was also ordered to forfeit over $2 million in assets to the region. David Norris, the head of Sirron Systems, was also convicted of fraud and corruption in 2019.

=== Regional reforms ===
Following these incidents, Halton Region conducted an extensive forensic audit and implemented mandatory fraud training for all staff. The region also updated its employee and vendor codes of conduct and launched civil litigation seeking over $20 million in damages from the parties involved.

== Geography ==
Identification of urban and rural features of the Region.

While the urban areas of Burlington, Oakville and Milton are experiencing rapid growth, there is still a significant proportion of the Region that is still rural, most of which is protected as part of the provincial Greenbelt or as part of the Niagara Escarpment Plan.

Halton is somewhat unusual, in that it has three distinct climate zones within its relatively small area, which are as follows:

- Zone 5a - Halton Hills lying to the north of the Niagara Escarpment, together with the Town of Milton within the Grand River watershed
- Zone 5b - the remainder of Halton Hills, Milton north of Derry Road, and that part of Burlington lying north of the Niagara Escarpment
- Zone 6a - the southern remainder of the Region

=== Climate ===
Climate data for Burlington TS Climate ID: 6151064; coordinates 43°20′N 79°50′W, elevation: 99.1 m (325 ft); 1981–2010 normals, extremes 1866–present (Note: Long term records have been recorded at various climate stations in or nearby Burlington since 1866)
Month	Jan	Feb	Mar	Apr	May	Jun	Jul	Aug	Sep	Oct	Nov	Dec	Year
Record high °C (°F)	18.4 (65.1)	17.9 (64.2)	27.2 (81.0)	32.0 (89.6)	36.1 (97.0)	38.9 (102.0)	41.1 (106.0)	38.3 (100.9)	37.8 (100.0)	31.1 (88.0)	26.7 (80.1)	22.0 (71.6)	41.1 (106.0)
Mean daily maximum °C (°F)	−0.6 (30.9)	0.8 (33.4)	5.2 (41.4)	12.4 (54.3)	19.4 (66.9)	25.0 (77.0)	28.0 (82.4)	26.7 (80.1)	21.8 (71.2)	15.1 (59.2)	8.0 (46.4)	2.4 (36.3)	13.7 (56.7)
Daily mean °C (°F)	−4.4 (24.1)	−3.2 (26.2)	1.0 (33.8)	7.5 (45.5)	13.9 (57.0)	19.4 (66.9)	22.5 (72.5)	21.4 (70.5)	16.9 (62.4)	10.4 (50.7)	4.4 (39.9)	−1 (30)	9.1 (48.4)
Mean daily minimum °C (°F)	−8.1 (17.4)	−7.1 (19.2)	−3.3 (26.1)	2.6 (36.7)	8.3 (46.9)	13.8 (56.8)	16.9 (62.4)	16.1 (61.0)	11.9 (53.4)	5.7 (42.3)	0.7 (33.3)	−4.3 (24.3)	4.4 (39.9)
Record low °C (°F)	−30.6 (−23.1)	−29.4 (−20.9)	−27.2 (−17.0)	−14.4 (6.1)	−7.2 (19.0)	0.0 (32.0)	1.1 (34.0)	1.7 (35.1)	−3.9 (25.0)	−11.1 (12.0)	−22.8 (−9.0)	−27.8 (−18.0)	−30.6 (−23.1)
Average precipitation mm (inches)	66.0 (2.60)	54.5 (2.15)	61.6 (2.43)	70.6 (2.78)	81.0 (3.19)	69.1 (2.72)	75.3 (2.96)	82.0 (3.23)	83.1 (3.27)	71.9 (2.83)	84.9 (3.34)	63.0 (2.48)	863.1 (33.98)
Average rainfall mm (inches)	31.8 (1.25)	33.0 (1.30)	44.7 (1.76)	68.2 (2.69)	81.0 (3.19)	69.1 (2.72)	75.3 (2.96)	82.0 (3.23)	83.1 (3.27)	71.9 (2.83)	79.7 (3.14)	43.5 (1.71)	763.3 (30.05)
Average snowfall cm (inches)	34.2 (13.5)	21.5 (8.5)	16.9 (6.7)	2.4 (0.9)	0.0 (0.0)	0.0 (0.0)	0.0 (0.0)	0.0 (0.0)	0.0 (0.0)	0.0 (0.0)	5.3 (2.1)	19.5 (7.7)	99.9 (39.3)
Average precipitation days (≥ 0.2 mm)	12.4	9.6	11.0	12.5	11.8	10.9	10.1	10.2	10.9	10.7	13.9	11.9	135.8
Average rainy days (≥ 0.2 mm)	4.9	4.5	8.0	11.7	11.8	10.9	10.1	10.2	10.9	10.7	12.7	7.7	113.9
Average snowy days (≥ 0.2 cm)	8.1	6.0	3.6	0.84	0.0	0.0	0.0	0.0	0.0	0.0	1.6	5.4	25.5
Source: Environment and Climate Change Canada

Climate data for Georgetown WWTP (Halton Hills) Climate ID: 6152695; coordinates 43°28′34″N 79°52′45″W; elevation: 221 m (725 ft); 1981–2010 normals
Month	Jan	Feb	Mar	Apr	May	Jun	Jul	Aug	Sep	Oct	Nov	Dec	Year
Record high °C (°F)	17.0 (62.6)	15.5 (59.9)	25.0 (77.0)	31.5 (88.7)	34.5 (94.1)	36.0 (96.8)	37.0 (98.6)	36.5 (97.7)	35.5 (95.9)	29.5 (85.1)	22.0 (71.6)	20.5 (68.9)	37.0 (98.6)
Mean daily maximum °C (°F)	−1.7 (28.9)	−0.2 (31.6)	4.6 (40.3)	12.1 (53.8)	19.1 (66.4)	24.4 (75.9)	26.9 (80.4)	25.8 (78.4)	21.4 (70.5)	14.3 (57.7)	7.3 (45.1)	1.1 (34.0)	12.9 (55.2)
Daily mean °C (°F)	−6.3 (20.7)	−5.2 (22.6)	−0.9 (30.4)	6.0 (42.8)	12.3 (54.1)	17.4 (63.3)	20.0 (68.0)	19.0 (66.2)	14.8 (58.6)	8.4 (47.1)	2.8 (37.0)	−2.9 (26.8)	7.1 (44.8)
Mean daily minimum °C (°F)	−10.9 (12.4)	−10.2 (13.6)	−6.4 (20.5)	−0.2 (31.6)	5.3 (41.5)	10.4 (50.7)	13.0 (55.4)	12.1 (53.8)	8.1 (46.6)	2.4 (36.3)	−1.7 (28.9)	−6.9 (19.6)	1.3 (34.3)
Record low °C (°F)	−33.0 (−27.4)	−31.5 (−24.7)	−28.0 (−18.4)	−13.0 (8.6)	−5.0 (23.0)	−0.5 (31.1)	3.0 (37.4)	0.0 (32.0)	−4.0 (24.8)	−8.5 (16.7)	−15.5 (4.1)	−29.5 (−21.1)	−33.0 (−27.4)
Average precipitation mm (inches)	67.8 (2.67)	60.0 (2.36)	57.2 (2.25)	76.5 (3.01)	79.3 (3.12)	74.8 (2.94)	73.5 (2.89)	79.3 (3.12)	86.2 (3.39)	68.3 (2.69)	88.5 (3.48)	65.9 (2.59)	877.4 (34.54)
Average rainfall mm (inches)	29.7 (1.17)	28.4 (1.12)	35.2 (1.39)	71.3 (2.81)	79.0 (3.11)	74.8 (2.94)	73.5 (2.89)	79.3 (3.12)	86.2 (3.39)	67.8 (2.67)	79.9 (3.15)	36.4 (1.43)	741.5 (29.19)
Average snowfall cm (inches)	38.1 (15.0)	31.7 (12.5)	22.1 (8.7)	5.2 (2.0)	0.3 (0.1)	0.0 (0.0)	0.0 (0.0)	0.0 (0.0)	0.0 (0.0)	0.5 (0.2)	8.6 (3.4)	29.5 (11.6)	135.9 (53.5)
Average precipitation days (≥ 0.2 mm)	12.6	9.4	10.6	12.4	11.9	11.2	10.6	10.6	11.7	12.3	13.3	12.3	138.9
Average rainy days (≥ 0.2 mm)	4.1	4.1	6.4	11.6	11.8	11.2	10.6	10.6	11.7	12.2	11.4	6.5	112.1
Average snowy days (≥ 0.2 cm)	9.4	6.2	4.8	1.4	0.04	0.0	0.0	0.0	0.0	0.27	2.5	6.9	31.5
Source: Environment and Climate Change Canada

Climate data for Oakville Southeast WPCP Climate ID: 615N745; coordinates 43°29′N 79°38′W; elevation: 86.9 m (285 ft); 1981–2010 normals, extremes 1971–2001
Month	Jan	Feb	Mar	Apr	May	Jun	Jul	Aug	Sep	Oct	Nov	Dec	Year
Record high °C (°F)	13.9 (57.0)	15.6 (60.1)	27.5 (81.5)	32.0 (89.6)	33.0 (91.4)	38.0 (100.4)	37.0 (98.6)	37.5 (99.5)	35.0 (95.0)	28.9 (84.0)	23.3 (73.9)	22.0 (71.6)	38.0 (100.4)
Mean daily maximum °C (°F)	−0.4 (31.3)	0.6 (33.1)	4.7 (40.5)	11.3 (52.3)	17.9 (64.2)	23.2 (73.8)	26.3 (79.3)	25.2 (77.4)	20.9 (69.6)	14.3 (57.7)	8.3 (46.9)	2.8 (37.0)	12.9 (55.2)
Daily mean °C (°F)	−4.7 (23.5)	−3.9 (25.0)	0.1 (32.2)	6.4 (43.5)	12.3 (54.1)	17.7 (63.9)	20.9 (69.6)	20.1 (68.2)	15.6 (60.1)	9.3 (48.7)	4.0 (39.2)	−1.3 (29.7)	8.1 (46.6)
Mean daily minimum °C (°F)	−8.9 (16.0)	−8.3 (17.1)	−4.5 (23.9)	1.5 (34.7)	6.8 (44.2)	12.1 (53.8)	15.4 (59.7)	15.0 (59.0)	10.2 (50.4)	4.3 (39.7)	−0.2 (31.6)	−5.5 (22.1)	3.2 (37.8)
Record low °C (°F)	−30.0 (−22.0)	−25.0 (−13.0)	−22.0 (−7.6)	−14.4 (6.1)	−3.3 (26.1)	1.1 (34.0)	7.0 (44.6)	3.0 (37.4)	−1.7 (28.9)	−7.0 (19.4)	−14.0 (6.8)	−27.0 (−16.6)	−30.0 (−22.0)
Average precipitation mm (inches)	59.8 (2.35)	46.7 (1.84)	54.4 (2.14)	65.2 (2.57)	73.9 (2.91)	71.0 (2.80)	75.8 (2.98)	78.3 (3.08)	73.5 (2.89)	70.0 (2.76)	79.3 (3.12)	58.8 (2.31)	806.7 (31.76)
Average rainfall mm (inches)	31.5 (1.24)	30.7 (1.21)	37.2 (1.46)	63.1 (2.48)	73.9 (2.91)	71.0 (2.80)	75.8 (2.98)	78.3 (3.08)	73.5 (2.89)	70.0 (2.76)	76.8 (3.02)	43.9 (1.73)	725.6 (28.57)
Average snowfall cm (inches)	28.3 (11.1)	16.1 (6.3)	17.2 (6.8)	2.1 (0.8)	0.0 (0.0)	0.0 (0.0)	0.0 (0.0)	0.0 (0.0)	0.0 (0.0)	0.0 (0.0)	2.5 (1.0)	14.9 (5.9)	81.0 (31.9)
Average precipitation days (≥ 0.2 mm)	9.6	7.2	9.0	11.1	10.4	10.3	8.8	9.8	10.2	10.4	11.1	9.7	117.6
Average rainy days (≥ 0.2 mm)	4.4	3.8	6.4	10.6	10.4	10.3	8.8	9.8	10.2	10.4	10.6	6.8	102.4
Average snowy days (≥ 0.2 cm)	5.6	3.7	3.2	0.7	0.0	0.0	0.0	0.0	0.0	0.0	1.0	3.4	17.6
Source: Environment and Climate Change Canada

GEORGETOWN WWTP

Climate chart (precipitation, max. and min. temperature)
J	F	M	A	M	J	J	A	S	O	N	D
67 −2 −11	59 −1 −10	66 5 −7	75 12 0	75 19 5	80 24 10	75 27 13	85 26 12	84 21 8	67 14 2	79 7 −2	73 1 −8
- █ Average max. and min. temperatures in °C
- █ Precipitation totals in mm
Imperial conversion
J	F	M	A	M	J	J	A	S	O	N	D
2.6 28 12	2.3 31 13	2.6 40 20	3 53 32	2.9 67 42	3.2 75 50	2.9 80 55	3.3 78 54	3.3 70 46	2.6 57 36	3.1 44 28	2.9 33 19
- █ Average max. and min. temperatures in °F
- █ Precipitation totals in inches

BURLINGTON TS

Climate chart (precipitation, max. and min. temperature)
J	F	M	A	M	J	J	A	S	O	N	D
67 −1 −9	57 0 −8	70 5 −3	73 12 2	80 19 8	71 25 14	72 28 17	77 27 16	89 22 12	74 15 6	78 8 1	72 2 −5
- █ Average max. and min. temperatures in °C
- █ Precipitation totals in mm
Imperial conversion
J	F	M	A	M	J	J	A	S	O	N	D
2.6 30 17	2.2 32 18	2.7 41 26	2.9 54 36	3.2 67 47	2.8 77 56	2.8 82 62	3 80 61	3.5 71 53	2.9 59 42	3.1 46 33	2.8 36 24
- █ Average max. and min. temperatures in °F
- █ Precipitation totals in inches

OAKVILLE SE WPCP

Climate chart (precipitation, max. and min. temperature)
J	F	M	A	M	J	J	A	S	O	N	D
59 −1 −9	44 0 −9	62 5 −4	68 11 1	70 18 7	71 23 12	73 26 15	78 25 15	79 21 10	69 14 5	72 8 0	65 2 −6
- █ Average max. and min. temperatures in °C
- █ Precipitation totals in mm
Imperial conversion
J	F	M	A	M	J	J	A	S	O	N	D
2.3 31 15	1.7 32 16	2.4 40 24	2.7 52 34	2.8 64 44	2.8 73 54	2.9 79 60	3.1 77 59	3.1 69 50	2.7 57 40	2.8 46 32	2.5 36 21
- █ Average max. and min. temperatures in °F
- █ Precipitation totals in inches

== Demographics ==
As a census division in the 2021 Census of Population conducted by Statistics Canada, the Regional Municipality of Halton had a population of 596,637 living in 208,601 of its 214,322 total private dwellings, a change of 8.8% from its 2016 population of 548,435. With a land area of 965.71 km^{2} (372.86 sq mi), it had a population density of 617.8/km^{2} (1,600.2/sq mi) in 2021. The unemployment rate was 5.3% during the year. The average household income was very high, at $121,000.

Canada census – Regional Municipality of Halton community profile

	2021	2016	2011
Population	596,637 (+8.8% from 2016)	548,435 (+9.3% from 2011)	501,669 (14.2% from 2006)
Land area	965.71 km^{2} (372.86 sq mi)	964.05 km^{2} (372.22 sq mi)	964.01 km^{2} (372.21 sq mi)
Population density	617.8/km^{2} (1,600/sq mi)	568.9/km^{2} (1,473/sq mi)	520.4/km^{2} (1,348/sq mi)
Median age	40.8 (M: 40.0, F: 42.0)	40.5 (M: 39.6, F: 41.3)
Private dwellings	214,322 (total) 208,601 (occupied)	192,980 (total)	182,304 (total)
Median household income	$121,000	$103,009

References: 2021 2016 2011

Historical census populations – Regional Municipality of Halton

Year	Pop.	±%
1976	228,497	—
1981	253,883	+11.1%
1986	271,389	+6.9%
1991	313,136	+15.4%
1996	339,875	+8.5%

Year	Pop.	±%
2001	375,229	+10.4%
2006	439,256	+17.1%
2011	501,669	+14.2%
2016	548,435	+9.3%
2021	596,637	+8.8%

Population counts are not adjusted for boundary changes.
Source: Statistics Canada

Largest ethnic origin in Halton Region by census tracts based on the 2021 census

The largest ethnicities in Halton as per the 2021 census are English (17.7%), Scottish (14.2%), Irish (13.9%), Italian (7.5%), German (6.8%), Indian (6.6%), Chinese (5.6%), French (5.1%), and Polish (4.6%).

Panethnic groups in the Regional Municipality of Halton (2001−2021)
Panethnic group	2021		2016		2011		2006		2001	
Panethnic group	Pop.	%	Pop.	%	Pop.	%	Pop.	%	Pop.	%
European (Note: Statistic includes all persons that did not make up part of a visible minority or an indigenous identity.)	374,375	63.48%	396,525	73.3%	401,580	81.06%	375,400	86.22%	338,060	90.78%
South Asian	81,245	13.78%	50,075	9.26%	31,860	6.43%	18,570	4.27%	10,115	2.72%
East Asian (Note: Statistic includes total responses of "Chinese", "Korean", and "Japanese" under visible minority section on census.)	39,330	6.67%	26,545	4.91%	16,295	3.29%	12,400	2.85%	7,430	2%
Middle Eastern (Note: Statistic includes total responses of "West Asian" and "Arab" under visible minority section on census.)	27,785	4.71%	16,695	3.09%	8,390	1.69%	5,010	1.15%	2,640	0.71%
Black	20,430	3.46%	15,230	2.82%	10,970	2.21%	8,100	1.86%	5,660	1.52%
Southeast Asian (Note: Statistic includes total responses of "Filipino" and "Southeast Asian" under visible minority section on census.)	17,295	2.93%	14,040	2.6%	10,855	2.19%	6,300	1.45%	3,145	0.84%
Latin American	11,495	1.95%	8,945	1.65%	6,315	1.27%	3,760	0.86%	1,550	0.42%
Indigenous	5,890	1%	5,455	1.01%	4,010	0.81%	2,640	0.61%	1,800	0.48%
Other (Note: Statistic includes total responses of "Visible minority, n.i.e." and "Multiple visible minorities" under visible minority section on census.)	11,940	2.02%	7,470	1.38%	5,175	1.04%	3,210	0.74%	2,010	0.54%
Total responses	589,770	98.85%	540,975	98.64%	495,440	98.76%	435,400	99.12%	372,410	99.25%
Total population	596,637	100%	548,435	100%	501,674	100%	439,256	100%	375,229	100%
Note: Totals greater than 100% due to multiple origin responses

== Economy ==
=== Labour force ===
Employment activity
	2011	2006	2001	1996
Participation rate		71.9%	72.1%	76.8%
Employment rate		68.5%	69.3%	72.8%
Unemployment rate		4.7%	4.0%	5.1%

Employment by industry
	2011	2006	2001	1996
Agriculture and resources		4,180	3,935	2,870
Construction		12,060	41,540	8,085
Manufacturing		31,635	41,540	33,235
Wholesale trade		18,915	38,440	14,760
Retail trade		27,245	38,440	22,175
Financial and real estate		23,030	19,550	16,150
Health care and social services		19,535	29,935	15,870
Educational services		17,060	29,935	13,250
Business services		53,975	45,120	31,045
Other services		39,565	32,935	31,490
Total		247,200	211,455	188,930

=== Agriculture ===
Trend per Census of Agriculture
Type	2011						2006						2001
Type	Halton Hills	Milton	Burlington	Oakville	Total	% change	Halton Hills	Milton	Burlington	Oakville	Total	% change	Total
Number of farms	169	209	70	21	469	▼15.6%	206	260	79	21	566	▼8.5%	619
Total area of farms (in hectares)	15,436	11,289	3,259	2,216	32,200	▼10.5%	16,747	12,592	4,306	2,331	35,976	▼10.0%	39,966
Area of land in crops	12,507	8,288	2,106	2,057	24,958	▼8.6%	13,353	8,741	3,084	2,133	27,311	▼10.4%	30,469
Gross farm receipts ($ millions)	39.99	57.36	23.24	3.35	123.94	▼6.1%	57.75	40.52	30.61	3.16	132.04	▼6.7%	141.47
Total cattle and calves	2,672	1,854	x	x	4,907	▼52.0%	3,571	2,725	3,919	0	10,215	▼11.8%	11,581
Total pigs	x	x	x	x	x	N/A	x	x	x	x	3,508	▼43.9%	6,254

x = suppressed for reasons of confidentiality

Halton's agricultural sector is supported by regional infrastructure such as the Port of Hamilton which is a growing agri-food hub for the import of agricultural inputs and the export of local crops.

=== 2018 economic report ===
The 2018 budget document contains additional specifics and updates as to the Region's finances. In that year, gross revenues were $1.2 billion while operating expenses totaled $821.5 million for a net revenue of $350.2 million, an increase of 1.2% over the previous year. The increase was mostly due to increases in grants and taxes. The Region included over 13,200 companies and employed over 229,000 persons. The credit rating of AAA was confirmed by S&P Global Ratings and Moody's Investors Service.

== See also ==
- List of municipalities in Ontario
- Halton Region Conservation Authority
- Halton District School Board
- Halton Catholic District School Board
- List of numbered roads in Halton Region
- List of secondary schools in Ontario § Regional Municipality of Halton
- Proposal for the Province of Toronto
