= Urban sprawl in Canada =

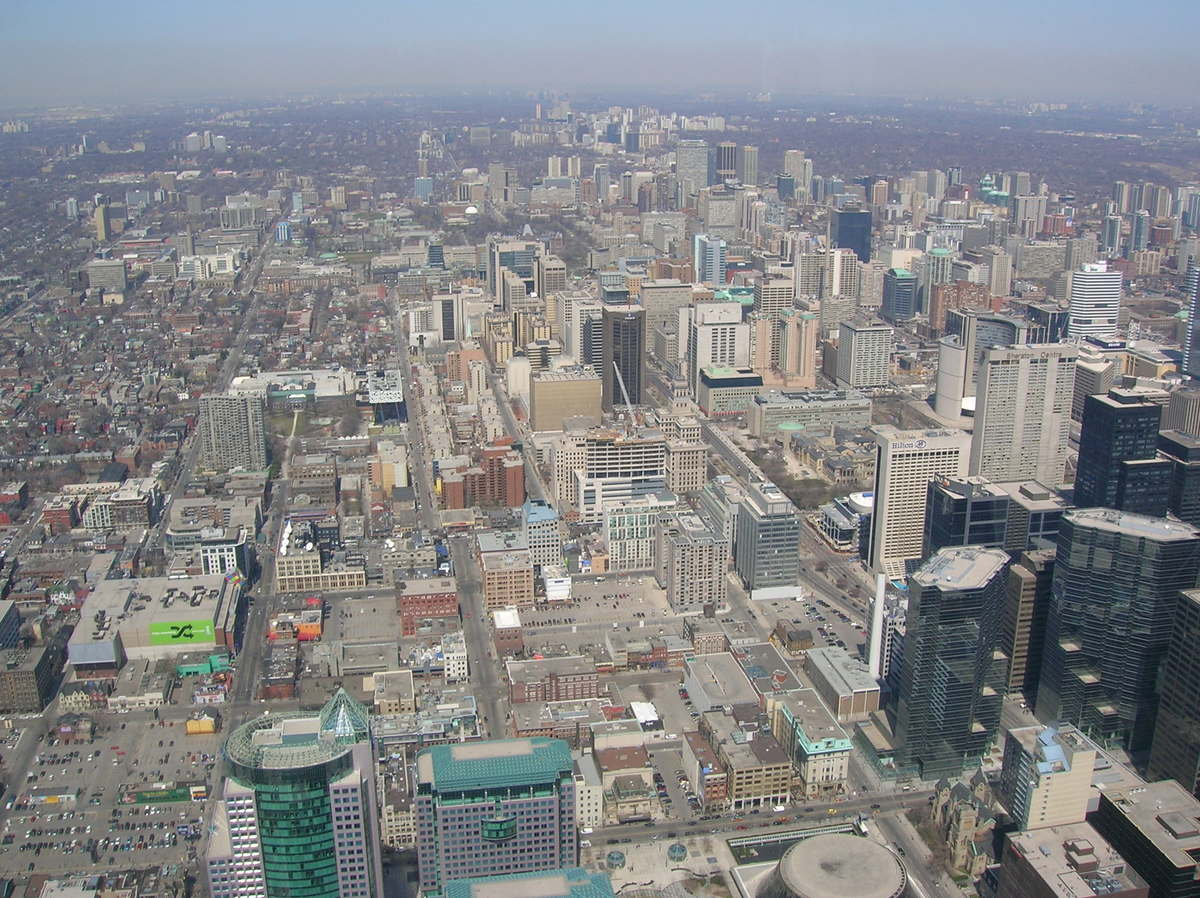
Urban landscape of Toronto, Canada

Urban sprawl in Canada is at times defined as growth in population paired with increases in low-density housing on the outskirts of urban developed lands. Spaces identified as experiencing urban sprawl are generally close to population centers and are further from amenities and public transit, which makes inhabitants rely more on cars for transportation, increasing emissions. Multiple cities in Canada have sprawled in recent years, yet densification is still the most common residential building action from 2016 to 2021. A significant increase in the speed of urban sprawl in Canada has occurred since the 1950s in large urban areas such as Montreal. This is all occurring on the backdrop of land dispossession in Canada leading originally Indigenous lands to be converted for urban residential use regardless of legal claims and rightful ownership. When using urban sprawl metrics such as WUP, WSPC, and other measures, indicators find that all Canadian cities are expanding and multiple tactics are being used to do so. PM Carney has emphasized development in Canada in 2025 and 2026 advertisement and speeches, indicating that this trend is going to increase as a way to combat protectionist US policies arising in 2025.

== History ==
Built-up areas in Canada have at least doubled in area from 1971 to 2011. This increase is from 5,651 km^{2} in 1971 to 14,546 km^{2} in 2011.

Changes in Built Up Areas in Canadian Urban Centers
City	Total Built Up Area in 1971 (km^{2})	Built up Area increase (km^{2})	Total Built Up Area in 2011 (km^{2})
Toronto	995	+1,189	2,184
Montreal	755	+816	1,571
Edmonton	342	+752	1,094
Vancouver	492	+503	995
Calgary	273	+427	700
Winnipeg	326	+233	559
Ottawa-Gatineau (Ontario Side)	219	+417	635
Ottawa-Gatineau (Quebec Side)	67	+261	328
Quebec City	183	+292	475
Halifax	148	+319	467

Urban sprawl in Montreal, Quebec, measured using WUP, has grown exponentially since 1951. In the last 25 years, sprawl is growing faster as well. In Quebec, the sprawl has increased greatly since the 1980s.

Land increases have been made on arable, natural and semi-natural land transitioning land use from green to urban. Leading cities with natural and semi-natural land use to residential land use changes are Montreal (+462 km^{2}), Toronto (+448 km^{2}), Halifax (+297 km^{2}) and Vancouver (+296 km^{2}). Agricultural lands surrounding Toronto have been depleted in favour of developing more residential areas to support the city's growing population. Census Metropolitan Areas in Ontario are expanding on high-quality agricultural land, 85% of development in Toronto, London, St. Catharines-Niagara, and Windsor was on agricultural land depleting the provinces usable agricultural land by 9% between 1971 and 2011.

== Indigenous context ==
Indigenous people have experienced land dispossession through Canada's history and continue to. The government used lower literacy rates among Indigenous communities at the time to dispossess them of land through treaty writing and awarding large tracts of land to arriving European settlers to attract them to different parts of the Canadian territory and encourage development. The government also engaged in violent acts to remove indigenous people. For example, during Canada's development, the King of France gave 540 km^{2} to diocesan priests in Deux Montagnes, Quebec, removing a Mohawk group from their land. This is an example of a norm during the European settlement of the country. Reserve lands are administered under the Indian Act and are referred to as Indian lands. Reserve lands now account for 0.2% of land in Canada.

House of Commons insignia

The House of Commons of Canada fully acknowledges the dispossession of Indigenous lands at the hands of European settlers. Efforts are being made in developing policy and reviewing existing policy and practices to attempt to return land to Indigenous peoples. Some indigenous groups have sued the Canadian government, used federal policies and other processes to settle their land claims. Dispossession has been linked to increased poverty in First Nations.

The territories are predominantly inhabited by indigenous peoples are represents 39.1% of the Canadian land mass, while only 0.3% of the population live there. This leads to underfunded housing, social services and health outcomes across all indigenous reserves in Canada. The remoteness of many indigenous reserves creates many challenges in planning, public services, and equal access to basic needs. Urban development in the territories can help close the gap of service accessibility, at the cost of disrupting natural areas and engaging in further urban sprawl in the country.

== Current trends ==
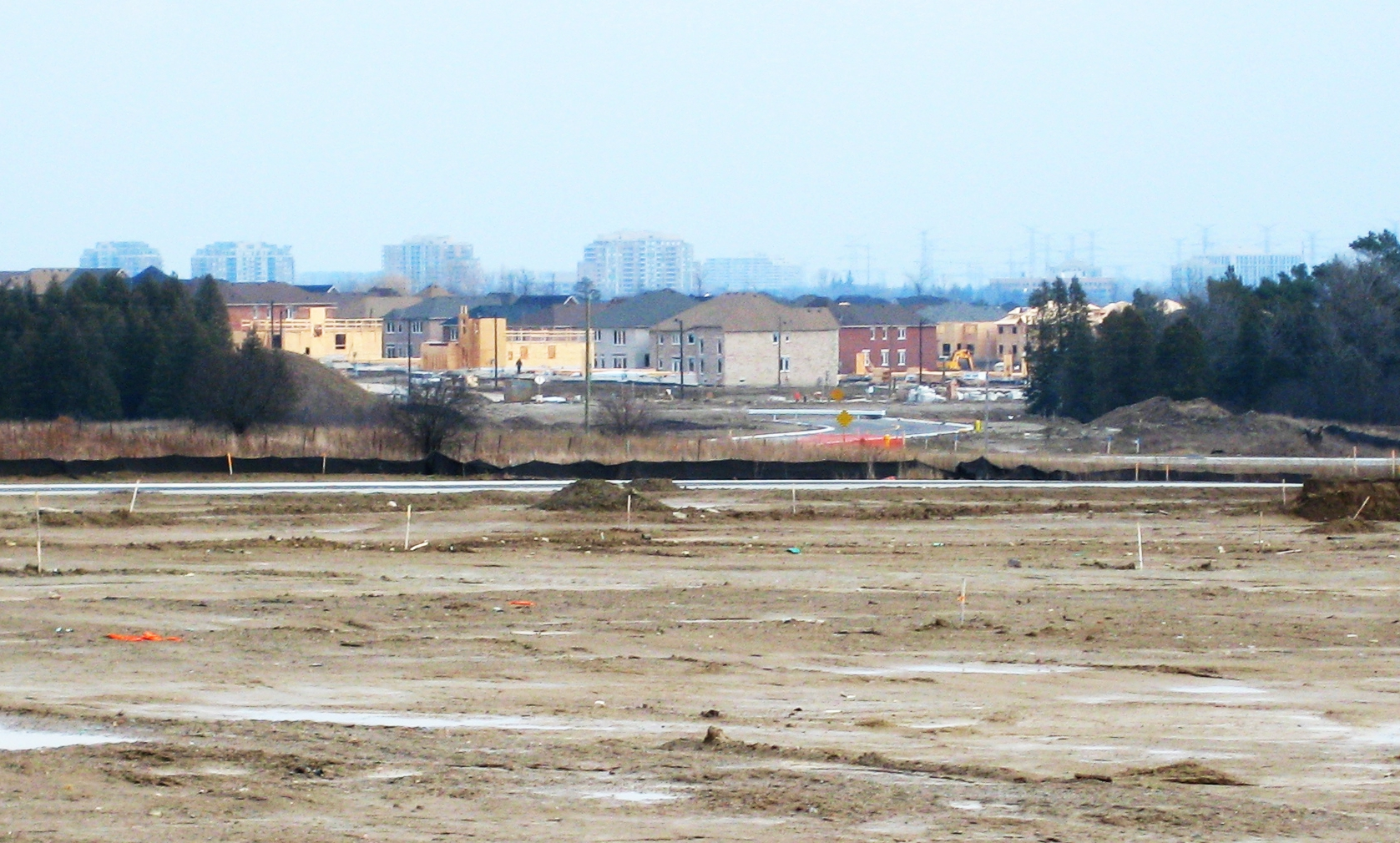
Suburban development and sprawl Maple, Ontario

Single-detached housing is still increasing in outskirts of urban areas generating more sprawl across Canada. People who are inhabiting these homes are generally higher income earners than those living in city centers. The population types are young adults in couples and immigrants in these sprawled areas compared to demographics in city centers.

Although some argue that Canada is less egregious than the US when it comes to urban sprawl, a comparison of urban development politics, laws, and institutions shows greater variance within Canada and the United States, than between them.

=== Pandemic-Related Trends ===
Some trends have arose since the lockdown, especially work from home allowing people to reduce commuting and increase their time at home. Single homes are less energy efficient than large buildings, but reductions in commuting occurs simultaneously. An increase in immigration since the pandemic also creates increasing demand for affordable housing.

=== Transportation and Land Use ===
Since 2000, Canada's major urban areas (Montreal, Toronto, Calgary, Edmonton, Hamilton, Ottawa-Gatineau, Quebec, Vancouver and Winnipeg) have grown by 34%, or 1700 km^{2}, while population density decreased by 6%. Urban sprawl in the country has increased by 34% while population growth grew by 26%. Recent urban areas experience low density of services and amenities. In low amenity neighbourhoods, car use increases to 60-80% in the CMA of Montreal. 80% of people in newly urbanized areas rely on cars whereas 64% of residents in medium-density neighbourhoods and 36% of people in high-density neighbourhoods.

Current issues exist with urban development encroaching on agricultural land, raising concerns about impacts on food production. As is seen in the History section above, large tracts of agricultural land adjacent to urban centers is changing from agriculture to residential.

=== Socioeconomic Factors ===
One problem is there are many incentives to homeowners and very few to renters, making the economic benefit of owning a home more attractive in Canada. In the current housing market, policies aimed at helping homeowners will continue to promote more urban sprawl. Canadians are found to prefer low-density housing.

=== Environmental Impacts ===
Homes being built from 2016 on feature more living space within on smaller plots of land, but this has significant environmental impacts such as increased energy use to heat and maintain the property. Heating costs are higher in detached housing whereas apartments, row houses and semi-detached homes use less energy to stay heated.

Bird population declines were linked to urban sprawl in a study observing changes between 1966 and 2005 in Eastern Canada. Increases were found in Neotropical bird species that were not linked to decreases in Neotropical forests, indicating that the reduction of forested lands in Northern areas are linked to these declines of northern bird populations rather than a reduction in Neotropical forests.

=== Economic Impacts ===
In Ottawa, low-density subdivisions cost the municipality on average 465$ per person annually whereas a surplus of 606$ per resident occurs in densely populated urban areas. Urban expansion in Calgary also costs the city more money for essential services such as sewage and electrical infrastructure to support outer bounded development.

=== Urban Sprawl Metrics ===
By Statistics Canada's account, the metropolitan area that experienced the most sprawl from 2016 to 2021 between P.E.I., Nova Scotia, New Brunswick, Ontario, Manitoba, Saskatchewan, Alberta, B.C., and Yukon, found Winnipeg to have experienced the most urban sprawl. This study uses the proportion of residential construction on newly developed land as the metric of sprawl in this example.

Canadian studies are generally regionally-scaled creating uneven metrics and measurements, inhibiting comparison. WUP measures how sprawled a landscape is per square meter in a reporting unit. WSPC measures how much an individual or business contributes to sprawl within a reporting unit. Some studies measure the intensity of land use for residential building whereas measurements of WUP And WSPC are able to account for land use by businesses as well, creating a land use intensity factor which informs planning efforts more holistically. Overall, consensus across agencies and organizations is not achieved in Canada.

== Policy responses ==
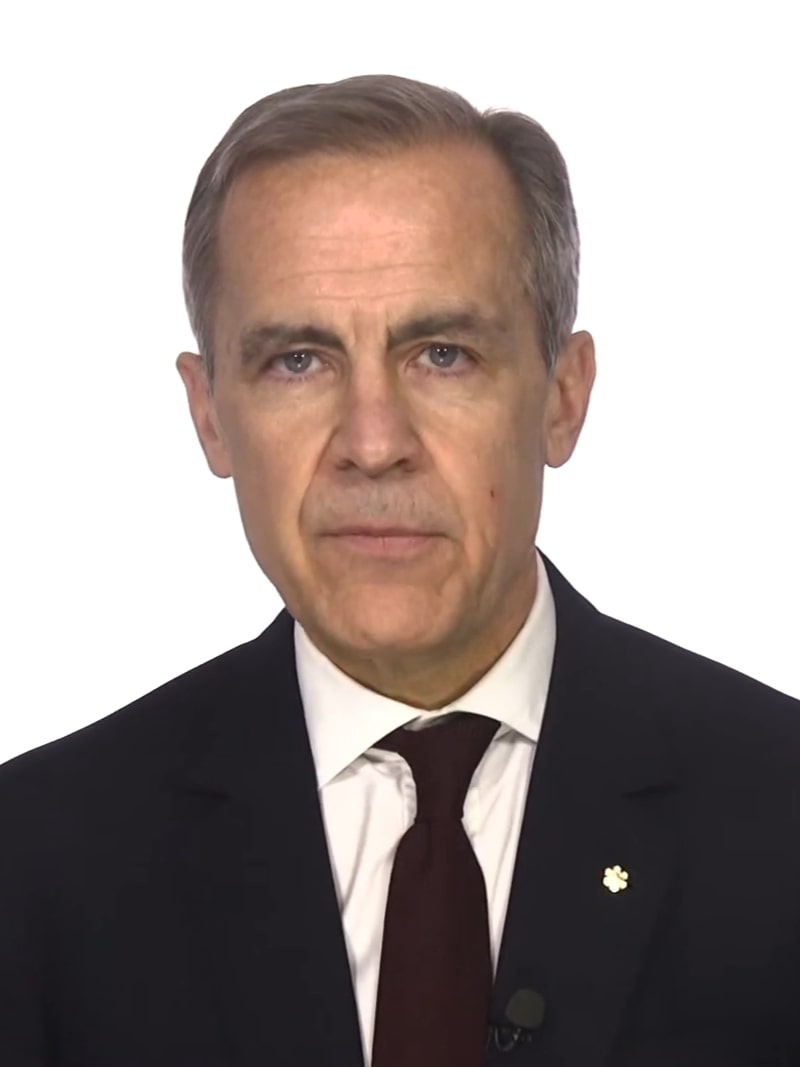
Mark Carney in 2020

=== Carney ===
Carney recently announced funding from the federal government to cut housing development costs in Ontario. Carney is also running on cutting carbon pricing to consumers, which encourages and lessens the cost of car-dependent commuting. This is in face of economic uncertainty driven by US policies in 2025. Federal public lands are to be used in this economic development strategy aimed at building affordable housing.

=== Policy to mitigate urban sprawl ===
Ontario engages in multiple policy strategies to try and limit urban sprawl. The province features a greenbelt in Toronto as defined by the Greenbelt Act (2005). The greenbelt project is mired in controversy as there is also a scandal surrounding the enactment of the Greenbelt Act. Provincial development plans including the Highway 413 could undermine policies to reduce sprawl and rather encourage further sprawl in the areas surrounding Toronto. In Ontario's Peel region, officials plan to extend urban development to accommodate growing populations, but advocates against urban sprawl are against this plan.

Notably, Montreal's Urban Agglomeration Land Use and Development Plan does not include a greenbelt, which can help reduce urban sprawl in Canada's second largest city. Greenbelts are seen to reduce urban sprawl in different development scenarios, but must be coupled with other development policies to truly reduce the climate change effects of development in the country.

Annexation is a common way for municipalities to purchase land with the intent of expanding onto them. It is a contributing factor to increased urban sprawl and a way for municipalities to encroach on regional planning. Calgary has increased in size through annexation, which costs the urban center more per housing unit and limits the ability of public transport to reach and accommodate living areas outside the city.
