= WUP =

The acronym WUP could refer to:

- the Western Upper Peninsula of Michigan
- the Western University of Pennsylvania
- the Worker-communism Unity Party of Iran
- the Wesleyan University (Philippines)
- the Writers' Union of the Philippines
- WUP, the product code used by Nintendo for Wii U hardware and software
- Weighted urban proliferation
