= Weighted urban proliferation =

Method for measuring urban sprawl

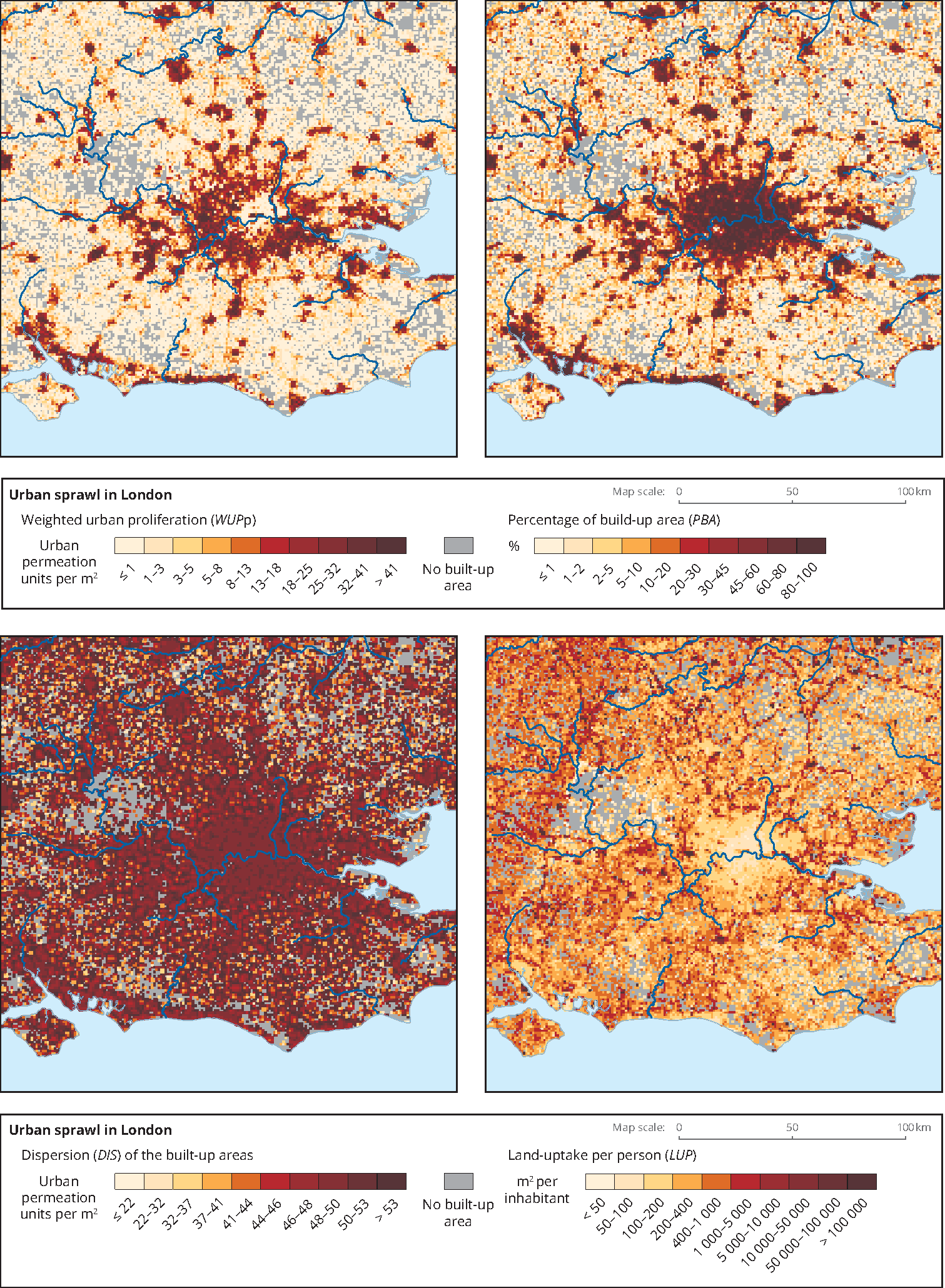
Urban sprawl in the Greater London Built-up Area at the 1 km^{2} scale in 2009 for: Weighted urban proliferation (WUPp), Percentage of build-up area (PBA), Dispersion (DIS) of the built-up areas and Land-uptake per person (LUP)

Weighted urban proliferation (WUP) is a method used for measuring urban sprawl. This method, first introduced by Jaeger et al. (2010), calculates and presents the degree of urban sprawl as a numeric value. The method is based on the premise that as the built-over area in a given landscape increases (amount of built-up area), and the more dispersed this built-up area becomes (spatial configuration), and the higher the uptake of this built-up area per inhabitant or job increases (utilization intensity in the built-up area), the higher the overall degree of urban sprawl.

The WUP method, thus, measures urban sprawl by integrating these three dimensions into a single metric.

$$\begin{align}
\text{WUP} &= \text{UP} \cdot w_1(\text{Dis}) \cdot w_2(\text{UD}) \\
\\
\text{where}~&
\begin{cases}
\text{UP} = \text{Urban Permeation} \\
w_1(\text{Dis}) = \text{Weighting}_1(\text{Dispersion})\\
w_2(\text{UD}) = \text{Weighting}_2(\text{Utilization Density})
\end{cases}
\end{align}$$

Since the utilization density and dispersion are weighted with the weighting functions $w_1(\text{Dis})$ and $w_2(\text{UD})$, this metric of urban sprawl is referred to as Weighted Urban Proliferation (WUP).

== Three components of the WUP method ==
=== Urban permeation ===
The first component of the WUP method is urban permeation (UP). UP measures the size of the built-up area as well as its degree of dispersion throughout the study area (reporting unit). The formula for UP is

$\text{UP} = \frac{\text{Size of Built-up Area}}{\text{Reporting Unit}} \cdot \text{Dispersion}$

UP is expressed in urban permeation units per m^{2} of land (UPU/m^{2}). Within the framework of the WUP method, built-up areas are defined as areas where buildings are located. Since roads, railway lines, and parking lots are not buildings, they are disregarded in the WUP method of measuring urban sprawl.

=== Dispersion ===
The second component of the WUP method is dispersion (DIS). This component is based on the idea that the degree of urban sprawl intensifies with both increasing amount of urban area and increasing dispersion. The dispersion metric analyses the pattern of built-up area on the landscape from a geometric perspective. The analysis is performed by taking distance measurements between random points within the built-up area. The average value is then computed from the measurement of all possible pairs of points. The farther apart any two points are, the higher the measurement value, and the higher their contribution to dispersion. Whereas the closer any two points are, the lower the value and the lower their contribution to dispersion. With the w1(DIS) function, dispersion values are weighted. This weighting function allows sections of the landscape where built-up areas are more dispersed to receive a higher weight, or a lower weighting for compact settled areas with low dispersion.

=== Utilization density ===
The third component of the WUP model is utilization density (UD). This component is based on the premise that as more people and jobs are located in the built-up area, the more efficient the utilization of the land becomes.

$\text{Utilization Density} = \frac{\text{Number of Inhabitants} + \text{Number of Jobs}}{\text{Size of Built-up Area}}$

The number of jobs is included in the calculation to emphasize that many downtown areas are dominated by office buildings that have very few residents, yet each building, and thus the land they are on, is densely utilized and should not be considered sprawl. With the w1(UD) function, utilization density values are weighted. This weighting function allows sections of the built-up area to receive a value between 0 and 1 depending on their utilization density. The higher the utilization density, the lower the weighting value. This lower weight reflects the understanding that dense subsections of the reporting unit, like inner cities, are not considered as urban sprawl.

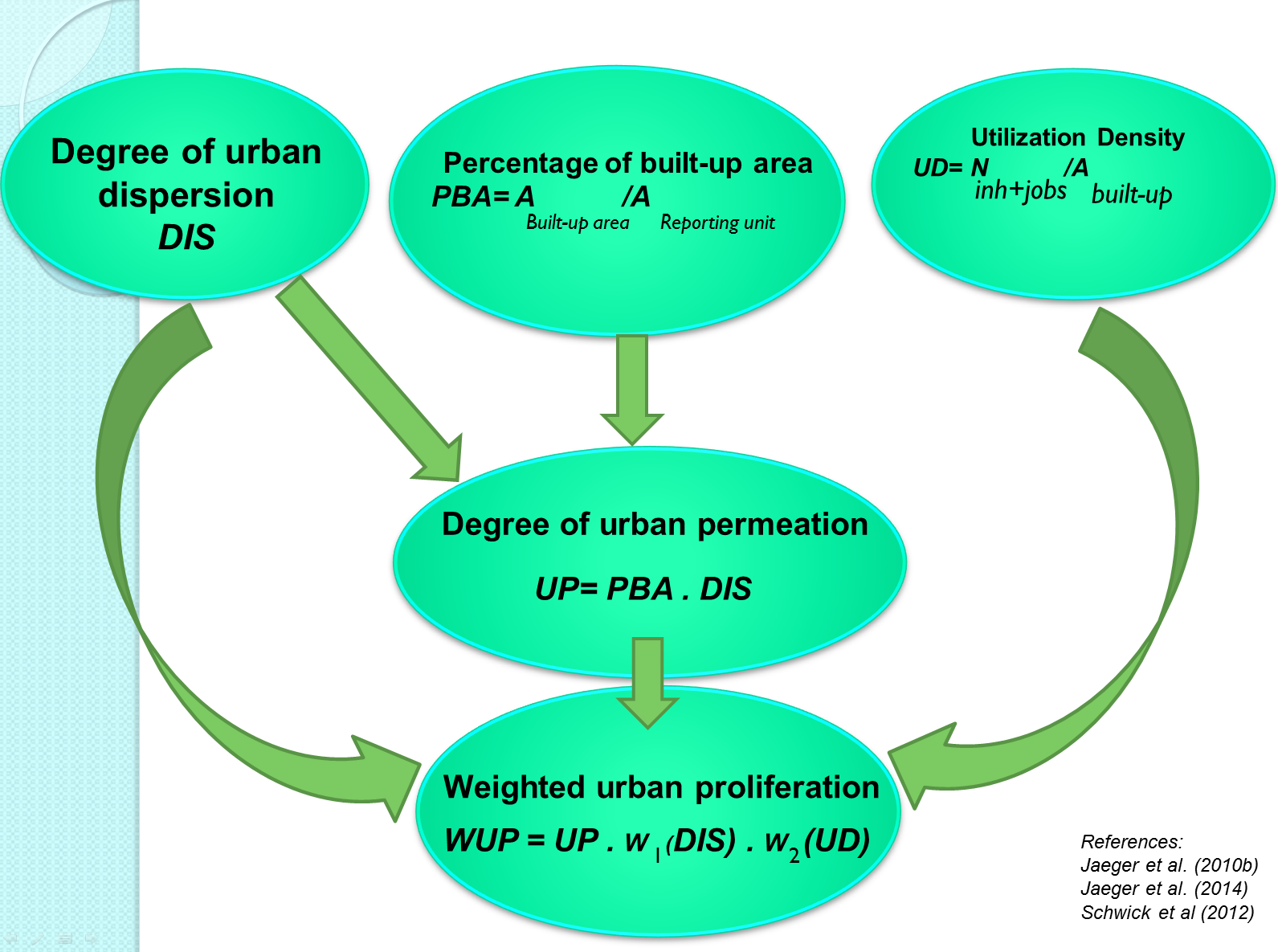
The relationships between the WUP metric and its components DIS, PBA, and UD

== Examples of projects which used the WUP method ==
Hayek et al. (2010) used settlement development scenarios for Switzerland, to find the causes of urban sprawl in order to reduce undesired future settlement developments. The results show that overall urban permeation and dispersion of settlement areas is likely to increase, in varying degrees, in all scenarios by 2030.

Jaeger & Schwick (2014) analysed historical changes as well as future scenarios for urban sprawl in Switzerland. They concluded that the degree of urban sprawl had increased by 155% between 1935 and 2002 and that, within the framework of modelling future scenarios, urban sprawl is likely to further increase by more than 50% by 2050 without abrupt mitigation measures.

Jaeger et al. (2015) analysed the degree of urban sprawl for 32 countries in Europe. The results show that large parts of Europe are affected by urban sprawl, and that significant increases took place between 2006 and 2009, however, the values of the individual countries differ greatly.

Nazarnia, Schwick & Jaeger (2016) compared patterns of accelerated urban sprawl, between 1951 and 2011, in the metropolitan areas of Montreal and Quebec City Canada, and Zurich in Switzerland. Their research determined that, in Montreal, the degree of urban sprawl increased 26-fold, Quebec City increased 9-fold, and Zurich 3-fold.

Torres, Jaeger & Alonso (2016) quantified spatial patterns of urban sprawl for mainland Spain at multiple scales. They tested the stability, non-stationarity, and scale-dependency of the relationship between landscape fragmentation patterns and urban sprawl.

Weilenmann, Seidl & Schulz (2017) analysed the major socio-economic determinants of change in urban patterns in Switzerland. Their analysis covered the years 1980–2010 and was conducted on all of the 2495 Swiss municipalities.
