= South Venice, Florida =

- Census-designated place
- Location in Sarasota County and the state of Florida
- Coordinates: 27°02′40″N 82°24′56″W
- Country: United States
- State: Florida
- County: Sarasota

Area
  - Total: 6.34 sq mi (16.42 km^{2})
  - Land: 5.96 sq mi (15.43 km^{2})
  - Water: 0.39 sq mi (1.00 km^{2})
- Elevation: 13 ft (4.0 m)

Population (2020)
  - Total: 15,619
  - Density: 2,622.5/sq mi (1,012.56/km^{2})
- Time zone: UTC-5 (Eastern (EST))
  - Summer (DST): UTC-4 (EDT)
- FIPS code: 12-68100
- GNIS feature ID: 2402880

South Venice is a census-designated place (CDP) in Sarasota County, Florida, United States. The population was 15,619 at the 2020 census, up from 13,949 at the 2010 census. It is part of the North Port–Bradenton–Sarasota, Florida Metropolitan Statistical Area.

== Geography ==
According to the United States Census Bureau, the CDP has a total area of 6.4 square miles (16.6 km^{2}), of which 6.0 square miles (15.6 km^{2}) is land and 0.39 square miles (1.0 km^{2}), or 6.17%, is water.

South Venice is west of North Port, south of Venice, and north of Englewood. In 2014, a land partnership with Mattamy Homes was created to develop the West Villages, a large community of subdivisions.

== Demographics ==
Historical population
Census	Pop.	Note	%±
1970	4,680		—
1980	8,075		72.5%
1990	11,951		48.0%
2000	13,539		13.3%
2010	13,949		3.0%
2020	15,619		12.0%

=== 2020 census ===
As of the 2020 census, South Venice had a population of 15,619. The median age was 54.6 years. 14.5% of residents were under the age of 18 and 30.4% were 65 years of age or older. For every 100 females there were 97.0 males, and for every 100 females age 18 and over there were 94.5 males age 18 and over.

There were 6,998 households in South Venice, of which 18.4% had children under the age of 18 living in them. Of all households, 48.3% were married-couple households, 17.7% were households with a male householder and no spouse or partner present, and 25.7% were households with a female householder and no spouse or partner present. About 27.0% of all households were made up of individuals and 15.3% had someone living alone who was 65 years of age or older.

There were 8,229 housing units, of which 15.0% were vacant. The homeowner vacancy rate was 2.3% and the rental vacancy rate was 12.1%. 100.0% of residents lived in urban areas, while 0.0% lived in rural areas.

According to Census Bureau QuickFacts, the population density was 2,622.8 inhabitants per square mile (1,012.7/km^{2}), 4.0% of residents were under 5 years old, and 50.2% of residents were female.

Racial composition as of the 2020 census
Race	Number	Percent
White	14,004	89.7%
Black or African American	144	0.9%
American Indian and Alaska Native	33	0.2%
Asian	210	1.3%
Native Hawaiian and Other Pacific Islander	3	0.0%
Some other race	276	1.8%
Two or more races	949	6.1%
Hispanic or Latino (of any race)	1,003	6.4%

=== Income and poverty ===
The median income for a household in the CDP was $64,445. 6.5% of the population lived below the poverty threshold. 93.3% of the population 25 years and older were high school graduates or higher and 22.6% of that same population had a Bachelor's degree or higher. 95.1% of households had a computer and 90.8% had a broadband internet subscription.
