= Florida Fire Frogs =

- 2017–2020; Kissimmee, Florida
Team logo
Cap insignia

Minor league affiliations
- Class: Class A-Advanced (2017–2020)
- League: Florida State League (2017–2020)

Major league affiliations
- Team: Atlanta Braves (2017–2020)

Minor league titles
- League titles: None

Team data
- Name: Florida Fire Frogs (2017–2020)
- Colors: Black, fire red, navel orange, golden sun, white
- Ballpark: CoolToday Park (2020); Osceola County Stadium (2017–2019)

The Florida Fire Frogs were a Minor League Baseball team of the Florida State League from 2017 to 2020. They were located in Kissimmee, Florida, and served as the Class A-Advanced affiliate of the Atlanta Braves.

Founded in 2017, the Fire Frogs played their home games at Osceola County Stadium in Kissimmee, part of the Greater Orlando metropolitan area, through 2019. In 2020, they were to have begun playing at CoolToday Park in North Port, Florida, but the season was cancelled due to the COVID-19 pandemic. They ceased operations after the Major League Baseball's reorganization of Minor League Baseball in 2021.

== History ==
The Fire Frogs were the relocation of the Brevard County Manatees. The team's name was announced on October 26, 2016, at the conclusion of a name-the-team contest. The finalists from which their name was selected were: "Dragonflies," "Fire Frogs," "Mud Kickers," "Rodeo Clowns," "Sorcerers," and "Toucans."

In May 2019, the team accepted a half-million-dollar buyout from Osceola County to leave at the end of the 2019 season. The stadium would be redeveloped as part of a training complex at Osceola Heritage Park for Orlando City SC of Major League Soccer.

In December 2019, the Fire Frogs' co-owner expressed an interest in returning the franchise to Brevard County, but their previous ballpark, Space Coast Stadium, was not available. Coastal Florida Sports Park was a possibility, but not until 2021. The team's future was further called into question when it was included in a list of teams that may have been folded as part of reorganization of Minor League Baseball after the 2020 season.

On January 16, 2020, the Braves announced that the Fire Frogs would play at their new spring training facility, CoolToday Park in North Port, for the 2020 season. The 2020 minor league baseball season, however, was cancelled due to the COVID-19 pandemic.

On December 9, 2020, the Braves announced their minor league affiliates as part of Major League Baseball's reorganization, which excluded the Fire Frogs.

== Season-by-season results ==
Year	League	Division	Regular season										Postseason
Year	League	Division	1st half					2nd half					Postseason
Year	League	Division	Finish	Wins	Losses	Win%	GB	Finish	Wins	Losses	Win%	GB	Postseason
2017	FSL	North	6th	25	41	.379	12	5th	23	40	.365	22	
2018	FSL	North	6th	29	37	.439	8	6th	22	43	.338	21	
2019	FSL	North	6th	25	41	.379	16.5	6th	29	41	.414	10	

Statistic	Wins	Losses	Win %
All-time regular season record (2017–2019)	153	243	.386
