= Milton, Ontario =

Town in Canada

Milton
- Town (lower-tier)
- Town of Milton
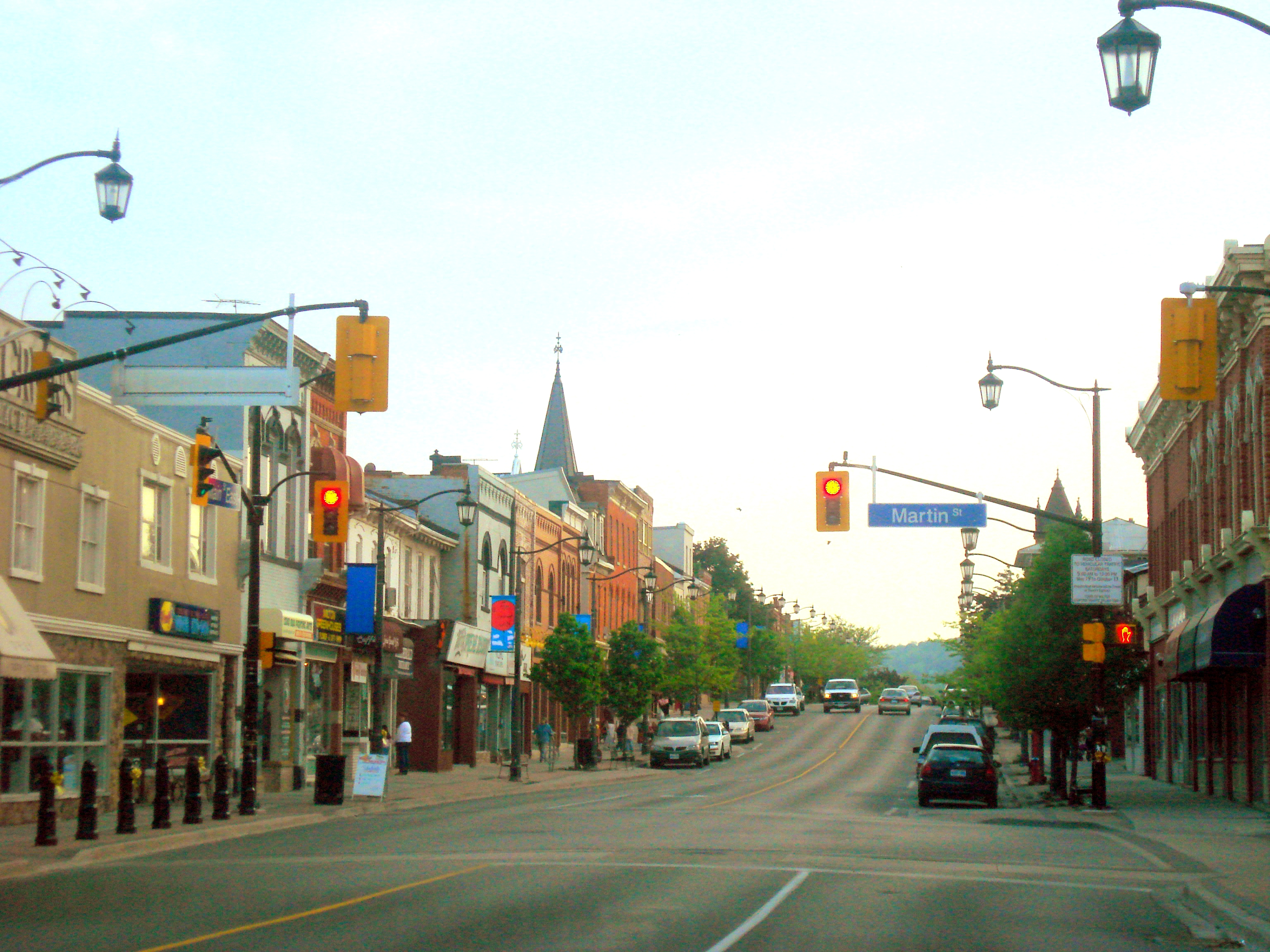
- Downtown Milton

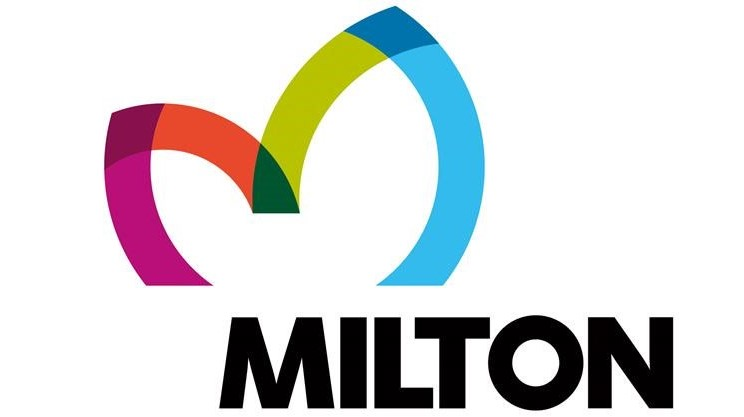
- Flag Coat of arms
- Motto: Look To This Day
- Interactive map of Milton
- Location within Regional Municipality of Halton Location within Southern Ontario
- Coordinates: 43°30′30″N 79°53′0″W
- Country: Canada
- Province: Ontario
- Region: Halton
- Established: May 17, 1818
- Incorporated: May 27, 1857 (town)

Government
  - Mayor: George Minakakis
  - MPs: Adam van Koeverden (L); Kristina Tesser Derksen (L)
  - MPP: Zee Hamid (PC)

Area
  - Land: 363.22 km^{2} (140.24 sq mi)
- Elevation: 195 m (640 ft)

Population (2021)
  - Total: 132,979 (43rd)
  - Density: 366.11/km^{2} (948.2/sq mi)
- Demonym: Miltonian
- Time zone: UTC−5 (EST)
  - Summer (DST): UTC-4 (EDT)
- Forward sortation area: L9E, L9T
- Area codes: 905, 289, 365, and 742
- Highways: Highway 401 former Highway 25
- Website: www.milton.ca

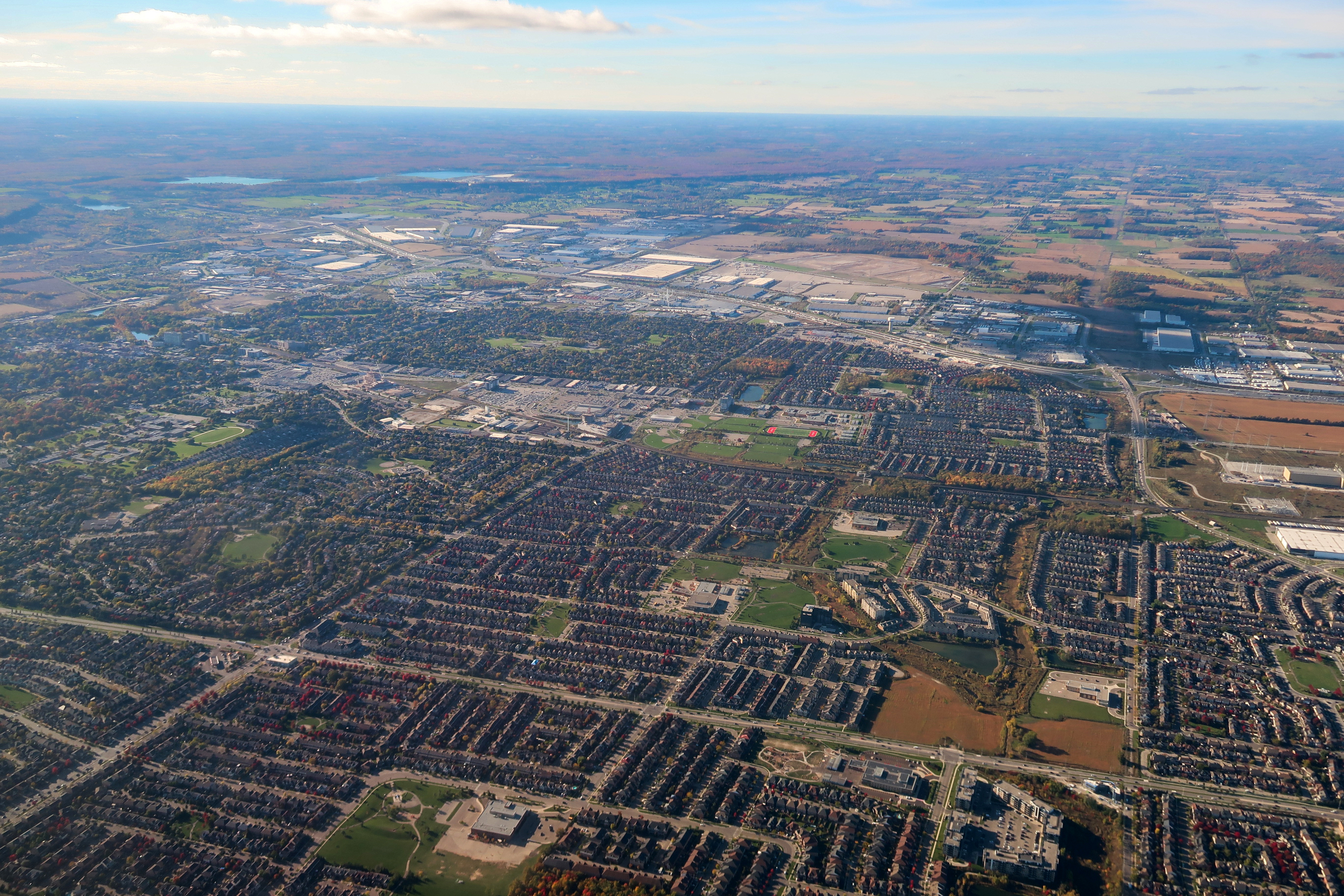
Aerial view of Milton

Milton (2021 population: 132,979) is a town in Southern Ontario, Canada, and part of the Regional Municipality of Halton in the Greater Toronto Area. Between 2001 and 2011, Milton was the fastest growing municipality in Canada, with a 71.4% increase in population from 2001 to 2006 and another 56.5% increase from 2006 to 2011. In 2016, Milton's census population was 110,128 with an estimated growth to 228,000 by 2031. It remained the fastest growing community in Ontario, but was deemed to be the 6th-fastest growing in Canada at that time.

Milton is located 54 km (34 mi) west of Downtown Toronto on Highway 401, and is the western terminus for the Milton line commuter train and bus corridor operated by GO Transit. Milton is situated on the Niagara Escarpment, a UNESCO world biosphere reserve and the Bruce Trail.

== History ==
The Mississaugas of the Credit held 648,000 acres of land north of the Head of the Lake Purchase lands and extending to the unceded territory of the Chippewa of Lakes Huron and Simcoe. In mid-October 1818, the Chippewa ceded their land to the Crown in the Lake Simcoe-Nottawasaga Treaty and, by the end of October, the Crown sought to purchase the adjacent lands of the Mississaugas of the Credit. The Deputy Superintendent of the Indian Department, William Claus, met with the Mississaugas from October 27–29, 1818, and proposed that the Mississaugas sell their 648,000 acres of land in exchange for an annual amount of goods. The continuous inflow of settlers into their lands and fisheries had weakened the Mississaugas' traditional economy and had left them in a state of impoverishment and a rapidly declining population. In their enfeebled state, Chief Ajetance (d. 1829), on behalf of the assembled people, readily agreed to the sale of their lands for £522.10 of goods paid annually. Significant municipalities found within the lands of the Ajetance Purchase of 1818 include Brampton and Milton.

The town took root out of a settlement by Jasper Martin along the Sixteen Mile Creek; Martin immigrated from Newcastle upon Tyne, England with his wife Sarah Coates and two sons on May 17, 1818. Martin was granted 100 acres (40 ha) of land, from the Crown in 1820, designated Lot 14, Concession 2, Township of Trafalgar. Martin built a grist mill along the creek and created a pond, known as Mill Pond, to power his mill. The mill became the centre of settlement for others as they settled in the region. In 1837 the area had a population of approximately 100 people and was named after the English poet John Milton. The town, as it is today, soon after became known as Milton. The two principal property owners of the young town were the Martins and the Fosters, whose names are still reflected in numerous buildings and streets in Milton.

Milton was incorporated into a town in 1857. Hugh Foster, of the aforementioned Foster family, donated 4 acres (1.6 ha) of land to the county to construct the Milton Town Hall which stands on Mary Street.

By 1869, Milton had a population of 1,000. Records from 1874 indicate that Milton had county buildings, a telegraph office, a foundry, a tannery, a woolen factory, a grist mill and a saw mill, a weekly newspaper and a number of stores.

In 1891, Milton used electricity to light its streets for the first time and in 1905 the Town purchased the Milton Electric Light Company and built its own power station.

In the early 1900s, Milton was well known for the P.L. Robertson Manufacturing Company — the first manufacturer to make socket-head screws. Although founded in Hamilton in 1907, the business relocated to Milton in 1908. P.L. Robertson was the inventor of the square-socket drive for screws.

In 1974, the town of Milton added parts of the former township of Esquesing (most of this township comprises Halton Hills), all of Nassagaweya Township including the village of Campbellville, and the northern sections of Trafalgar and Nelson from (a 1962 annexation of the former townships) Oakville and Burlington respectively.

With the addition of the Niagara Escarpment lands, tourism, recreation, and heritage conservation have increased in importance. The Halton Region Museum, which has a large number of historic agricultural buildings, and the Halton County Radial Railway museum are located in Milton, as is Country Heritage Park (formerly the Ontario Agricultural Museum). Five large parks operated by Conservation Halton reside in the town, and Mohawk Raceway is located near Campbellville. It is also home to Maplehurst Correctional Complex, the Vanier Centre for Women and one of two criminal courthouses serving Halton Region.

On January 1, 2010, the City of Mississauga bought land along the eastern side of Milton's border, reducing Milton's area by 400 acres (1.6 km^{2}), and affecting 25 residents.

== Climate ==
Milton is classified as a humid continental climate (Dfb) in the Koppen climate classification system. The town has 4 distinct seasons and year round precipitation with warm, rainy summers with cool nights and long, cold, and snowy winters.

Climate data for Milton, Ontario (1951–1980)
Month	Jan	Feb	Mar	Apr	May	Jun	Jul	Aug	Sep	Oct	Nov	Dec	Year
Record high °C (°F)	12.2 (54.0)	11.7 (53.1)	22.5 (72.5)	27.8 (82.0)	31.1 (88.0)	33.3 (91.9)	34.4 (93.9)	35.0 (95.0)	33.9 (93.0)	29.4 (84.9)	21.1 (70.0)	16.1 (61.0)	35.0 (95.0)
Mean daily maximum °C (°F)	−3.1 (26.4)	−2.0 (28.4)	2.7 (36.9)	11.3 (52.3)	18.3 (64.9)	24.0 (75.2)	26.6 (79.9)	25.5 (77.9)	21.0 (69.8)	14.3 (57.7)	6.6 (43.9)	−0.2 (31.6)	12.1 (53.8)
Daily mean °C (°F)	−6.8 (19.8)	−6.2 (20.8)	−1.2 (29.8)	6.3 (43.3)	12.4 (54.3)	18.0 (64.4)	20.6 (69.1)	19.7 (67.5)	15.5 (59.9)	9.3 (48.7)	3.1 (37.6)	−3.4 (25.9)	7.3 (45.1)
Mean daily minimum °C (°F)	−10.4 (13.3)	−10.3 (13.5)	−5.1 (22.8)	1.3 (34.3)	6.5 (43.7)	12.0 (53.6)	14.5 (58.1)	14.0 (57.2)	10.0 (50.0)	4.4 (39.9)	−0.3 (31.5)	−6.5 (20.3)	2.5 (36.5)
Record low °C (°F)	−32.8 (−27.0)	−31.5 (−24.7)	−24.5 (−12.1)	−15 (5)	−4.5 (23.9)	1.0 (33.8)	3.9 (39.0)	1.1 (34.0)	−3.3 (26.1)	−7.8 (18.0)	−13.3 (8.1)	−29 (−20)	−32.8 (−27.0)
Average precipitation mm (inches)	72.7 (2.86)	65.9 (2.59)	72.3 (2.85)	79.2 (3.12)	68.0 (2.68)	72.9 (2.87)	57.7 (2.27)	88.4 (3.48)	72.2 (2.84)	68.0 (2.68)	77.2 (3.04)	80.4 (3.17)	874.9 (34.44)
Average rainfall mm (inches)	20.7 (0.81)	24.9 (0.98)	44.6 (1.76)	72.1 (2.84)	68.0 (2.68)	72.9 (2.87)	57.7 (2.27)	88.4 (3.48)	72.2 (2.84)	67.4 (2.65)	67.8 (2.67)	41.5 (1.63)	698.2 (27.49)
Average snowfall cm (inches)	45.2 (17.8)	38.3 (15.1)	23.5 (9.3)	6.8 (2.7)	0.0 (0.0)	0.0 (0.0)	0.0 (0.0)	0.0 (0.0)	0.0 (0.0)	1.8 (0.7)	9.9 (3.9)	35.9 (14.1)	161.4 (63.5)
Average precipitation days (≥ 0.2 mm)	13	12	12	11	10	10	8	10	9	10	12	15	132
Average rainy days (≥ 0.2 mm)	3	3	6	10	10	10	8	10	9	10	9	5	93
Average snowy days (≥ 0.2 cm)	11	9	7	2	0	0	0	0	0	0	3	10	42
Source: Environment Canada

== Demographics ==
Historic populations
Year	Pop.	±%
1871	891	—
1901	1,372	+54.0%
1911	1,654	+20.6%
1921	1,873	+13.2%
1931	1,839	−1.8%
1941	1,964	+6.8%
1951	2,451	+24.8%
1961	5,629	+129.7%
1971	7,018	+24.7%
1981	28,067	+299.9%
1991	32,075	+14.3%
1996	32,104	+0.1%
2001	31,471	−2.0%
2006	53,939	+71.4%
2011	84,362	+56.4%
2016	110,128	+30.5%
2021	132,979	+20.7%

In the 2021 Census of Population conducted by Statistics Canada, Milton had a population of 132,979 living in 40,038 of its 41,000 total private dwellings, a change of 20.7% from its 2016 population of 110,128. With a land area of 363.83 km^{2} (140.48 sq mi), it had a population density of 365.5/km^{2} (946.6/sq mi) in 2021.

An October 2019 report stated that the average household income was $111,875, that the unemployment rate was 5.7%, and that the crime rate per 100,000 residents was low, at 2,133.

=== Ethnicity ===
Panethnic groups in the Town of Milton (2001−2021)
Panethnic group	2021		2016		2011		2006		2001	
Panethnic group	Pop.	%	Pop.	%	Pop.	%	Pop.	%	Pop.	%
European (Note: Statistic includes all persons that did not make up part of a visible minority or an indigenous identity.)	57,950	44.09%	61,280	56.25%	58,045	69.45%	43,865	82.14%	29,800	96.11%
South Asian	37,100	28.23%	22,895	21.02%	11,685	13.98%	3,105	5.81%	210	0.68%
Middle Eastern (Note: Statistic includes total responses of "West Asian" and "Arab" under visible minority section on census.)	9,170	6.98%	4,820	4.42%	1,810	2.17%	625	1.17%	45	0.15%
African	7,655	5.82%	5,280	4.85%	2,740	3.28%	1,695	3.17%	310	1%
Southeast Asian (Note: Statistic includes total responses of "Filipino" and "Southeast Asian" under visible minority section on census.)	6,585	5.01%	5,095	4.68%	3,335	3.99%	1,345	2.52%	95	0.31%
East Asian (Note: Statistic includes total responses of "Chinese", "Korean", and "Japanese" under visible minority section on census.)	4,775	3.63%	3,425	3.14%	2,120	2.54%	1,040	1.95%	235	0.76%
Latin American	3,405	2.59%	2,575	2.36%	1,665	1.99%	700	1.31%	55	0.18%
Indigenous	945	0.72%	1,040	0.95%	545	0.65%	425	0.8%	170	0.55%
Other (Note: Statistic includes total responses of "Visible minority, n.i.e." and "Multiple visible minorities" under visible minority section on census.)	3,850	2.93%	2,520	2.31%	1,625	1.94%	610	1.14%	100	0.32%
Total responses	131,430	98.84%	108,935	98.92%	83,580	99.07%	53,405	99.01%	31,005	98.52%
Total population	132,979	100%	110,128	100%	84,362	100%	53,939	100%	31,471	100%

- Note: Totals greater than 100% due to multiple origin responses.

=== Language ===
The 2021 census found that English was the mother tongue of 55.6% of the population. The next most common mother tongues were Urdu (9.7%), Arabic (4.1%), Spanish (2.3%), Punjabi (1.8%), Tagalog (Filipino) (1.5%), Polish (1.3%), Portuguese (1.3%), Mandarin (1.1%), French (1.1%), and Hindi (1.1%).

=== Religion ===
According to the 2021 census, the religion with the most adherents in Milton is Christianity (48.2%). Other religions include Islam (23.1%), Hinduism (6.1%), Sikhism (2.4%), and Buddhism (0.6%), and 18.9% reported no religious affiliation.

== Neighbourhoods ==
Milton's Planning Department divides the town into communities. These divisions have little to do with politics and are based on traditional neighbourhoods.

Neighbourhood	Description
Old Milton	Old Milton was built mainly between 1850 and 1890. Its boundaries are Bronte St S – CP Railroad Tracks – Thompson Rd – Robert St/Nipissing Rd.
Beaty	The Beaty neighbourhood started in 2001, this first homes to be built in "New Milton". Beaty is bounded by Derry Rd – Louis St. Laurent Ave – James Snow Pkwy – Thompson Rd. This neighbourhood was named for the Beaty Family who farmed in Trafalgar Township for more than a century. John Beaty emigrated from Ireland in 1820 and was one of the first settlers in the new survey. Between 1856 and 1857 Beaty held a number of offices and made an unsuccessful attempt to win a seat in the Provincial Legislature. John's son, William, became a pioneer of innovative agricultural practices.
Bronte Meadows	Bronte Meadows was constructed between 1982 and 1985. Its boundaries are Derry Rd – Bell St – Bronte St – Commercial St. This area is well known for its excellent tobogganing hill at Sixteen Mile Creek, as well as John Tonelli arena. Milton District Hospital and the Milton Sports Centre are found just on the other side of Derry Road.
Bowes	Bowes is a new neighbourhood being developed in south Milton in the Boyne Survey, which will add 6,000 new homes and approximately 25,000 new residents. Construction of this survey began in 2015. Bowes is bounded by James Snow Pkwy – Britannia Rd – Thompson Rd S – Louis St Laurent Ave.
Cobden	Cobden is a new neighbourhood being developed in south Milton in the Boyne Survey, which will add 6,000 new homes and approximately 25,000 new residents. Construction of this survey began in 2015. Cobden is bounded by Thompson Rd S – Britannia Rd – Regional Road 25 – Louis St Laurent Ave.
Clarke	The Clarke neighbourhood started building in 2003 and construction is still ongoing today. Clarke's boundaries include Derry Rd – CP Railroad Tracks – Thompson Rd – James Snow Pkwy. The neighbourhood was named after Samuel Clarke, a long time agriculturist and municipal politician. Clarke founded Milton's first newspaper The Halton Journal in 1855 and sold it nine months later to Rowe & Graham. Clarke was also a founding member of the Halton Agricultural Society, serving as its first secretary-treasurer until 1857.
Coates	The Coates neighbourhood began construction in 2005 and is bordered by Derry Rd – Louis St. Laurent Ave – Thompson Rd – Ontario St.
Dempsey	The Dempsey neighbourhood began construction in 2002, bounded by Steeles Ave – CP Railroad Tracks – Thompson Rd – James Snow Pkwy. The Dempsey neighbourhood is named after John Dempsey, who emigrated from Ireland in the mid-1800s with his wife and 7 children. After arriving in Milton he built "Winding Sixteen Farm". Dempsey also opened a dry goods, grocery, and hardware store in the community. He also served as a member of the Milton Council in 1860 & 1861.
Dorset Park	Dorset Park, registered in 1973 by British residential construction firm Wimpey Homes, is named after Dorset County in Southern England. The neighbourhood is bordered by Steeles Ave – Main St E – Ontario St & Thompson Rd.
Fallingbrook	Fallingbrook was built which was in the 1960s – the area is just South of Old Milton has quite a few heritage homes. It falls in the area south of Barton and Sydney Sts – east of the CN Railway tracks – west of Ontario St – north of Laurier Ave.
Ford	Ford is a neighbourhood being developed in south Milton in the Boyne Survey, which will add 6,000 new homes and approximately 25,000 new residents. Construction of this survey began in 2015. Ford is bounded by Bronte St S – Britannia Rd – Regional Road 25 – Louis St Laurent Ave.
Forrest Grove	Forrest Grove is bounded by Ontario St – Milton Evergreen Cemetery – Sixteen Mile Creek – Parkway Dr E.
Harrison	The Harrison neighbourhood, also known as Hawthorne Village South, was established by Mattamy Homes in 1999, with construction beginning in 2007. Hawthorne Village is home to 3,500 families. The boundaries for Harrison are the CN Railway Tracks – Tremaine Rd – Louis St. Laurent Ave – Derry Rd.
Milton Heights	The neighbourhood is bordered by Steeles Ave – Peru Rd – Highway 401 – Old Tremaine Rd
Mountainview	Mountainview was named for the extensive views of the Niagara Escarpment from its most westerly vantage point. It was the first area built after the sewage plant was built in 1949. Mountainview is bordered by Steeles Ave – Woodward Ave– Bronte St N – Ontario St.
Scott	The Scott neighbourhood is bounded by Tremaine Rd – Derry Rd – CN Railroad tracks – Main St.
Timberlea	Timberlea sprung up in the 1980s and is bounded by Derry Rd – Main St E – Ontario St – Thompson Rd.
Valleyview	Valleyview is dominated by high-end homes on Valleyview Cres and is bounded by Ontario St – Laurier Ave – Sixteen Mile Creek.
Walker	Walker is a neighbourhood being developed in south Milton in the Boyne Survey, which will add 6,000 new homes and approximately 25,000 new residents. Construction of this development began in 2015. Walker is bounded by Tremaine Rd – Britannia Rd – Bronte St S – Louis St Laurent Ave.
Willmott	Willmott District started construction in 2010 and will continue through 2014. Willmott is bounded by Louis St. Laurent Ave – Derry Rd – Ontario St – The Railway Tracks.

== Education ==
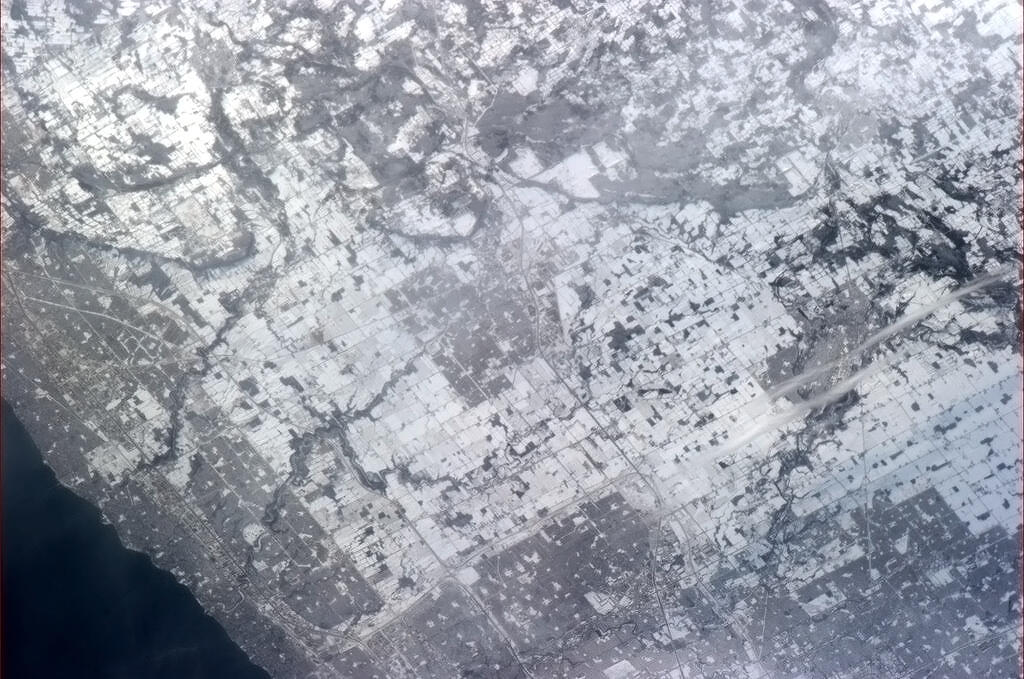
Milton, seen from the International Space Station, in late winter. This photograph was taken by astronaut Chris Hadfield, who grew up in Milton and is the namesake of Chris Hadfield Public School.

Milton's public elementary and secondary schools are part of the Halton District School Board. Milton's Catholic elementary and secondary schools are part of the Halton Catholic District School Board. There are also several private schools in Milton.

In 2008, the town reached an agreement in principle with Wilfrid Laurier University for the latter to establish a satellite campus in Milton. Funding of $90 million for the Milton Education Village which would also include a Conestoga College satellite campus, on land donated by the town, was approved by the provincial government in April 2018. In October 2018 funding for the project was withdrawn by the new Ontario government (elected in June) before construction had begun. Mayor Gord Krantz indicated that the town would look for alternative funding.

As of the fall 2019 season, there were no reports of funding for a Milton campus but Wilfrid Laurier University was offering some services in town, including a Master of Education program at the Milton Education Village Innovation Centre and a Lecture Series. In summer, Laurier was operating the Enriched Academic Program (LEAP) day camp.

=== Provincial and Demonstration Schools ===
- E. C. Drury School for the Deaf (JK–12)

=== Halton District School Board ===
- Anne J. MacArthur Public School (JK–8)
- Boyne Public School (JK–8)
- Brookville Public School (JK–8)
- Bruce Trail Public School (JK–8)
- Cedar Ridge Public School (JK–8)
- Chris Hadfield Public School (JK–8)
- Craig Kielburger Secondary School (9–12)
- E. W. Foster Public School (JK–5)
- Elsie MacGill Secondary School (9–12)
- Escarpment View Public School (JK–8)
- Hawthorne Village Public School (JK–8)
- Irma Coulson Public School(JK–8)
- J. M. Denyes Public School (JK–5)
- Martin Street Public School (JK–7)
- Milton District High School (9–12)
- P. L. Robertson Public School (JK–8)
- Rattlesnake Point Public School (JK–8)
- Robert Baldwin Public School (JK–5)
- Sam Sherratt Public School (JK–8)
- Tiger Jeet Singh Public School (JK–8)
- Viola Desmond Public School (JK–8)
- W. I. Dick Middle School (6–8)

=== Halton Catholic District School Board ===
- Bishop Reding Catholic Secondary School (9–12)
- Guardian Angels Catholic School (JK–8)
- Holy Rosary Catholic School (JK–8)
- Lumen Christi Catholic School (JK–8)
- Our Lady of Fatima Elementary School (JK–8)
- Our Lady of Victory School (JK–8)
- Queen of Heaven Catholic Elementary School (JK–8)
- St. Anthony of Padua Catholic School (JK–8)
- St. Benedict's Catholic Elementary School (JK–8)
- St. Francis Xavier Catholic Secondary School (9–12)
- St. Kateri Tekakwitha Catholic Secondary School (9-12)
- St. Peter Catholic School (JK–8)
- St. Scholastica Catholic Elementary School (JK-8)

=== Conseil Scolaire Catholique Mon Avenir (French Catholic School Board) ===
- École Élémentaire Catholique Ste-Anne (JK–6)
- École Élémentaire St-Nicolas (JK–6)

=== Conseil Scolaire Viamonde (French Public School Board) ===
- École élémentaire Dyane-Adam (JK–6)

=== Private schools ===
- Halton Waldorf School (JK–8)
- Hitherfield School (PK–8)
- Keswick Sutherland School & Equestrian Centre (JK–8)
- Milton Christian School (JK–8)
- The Montessori Country School (Casa)
- Suffah Academy (JK–8)
- Tarbiyah Elementary School (JK–8)

=== Public library system ===
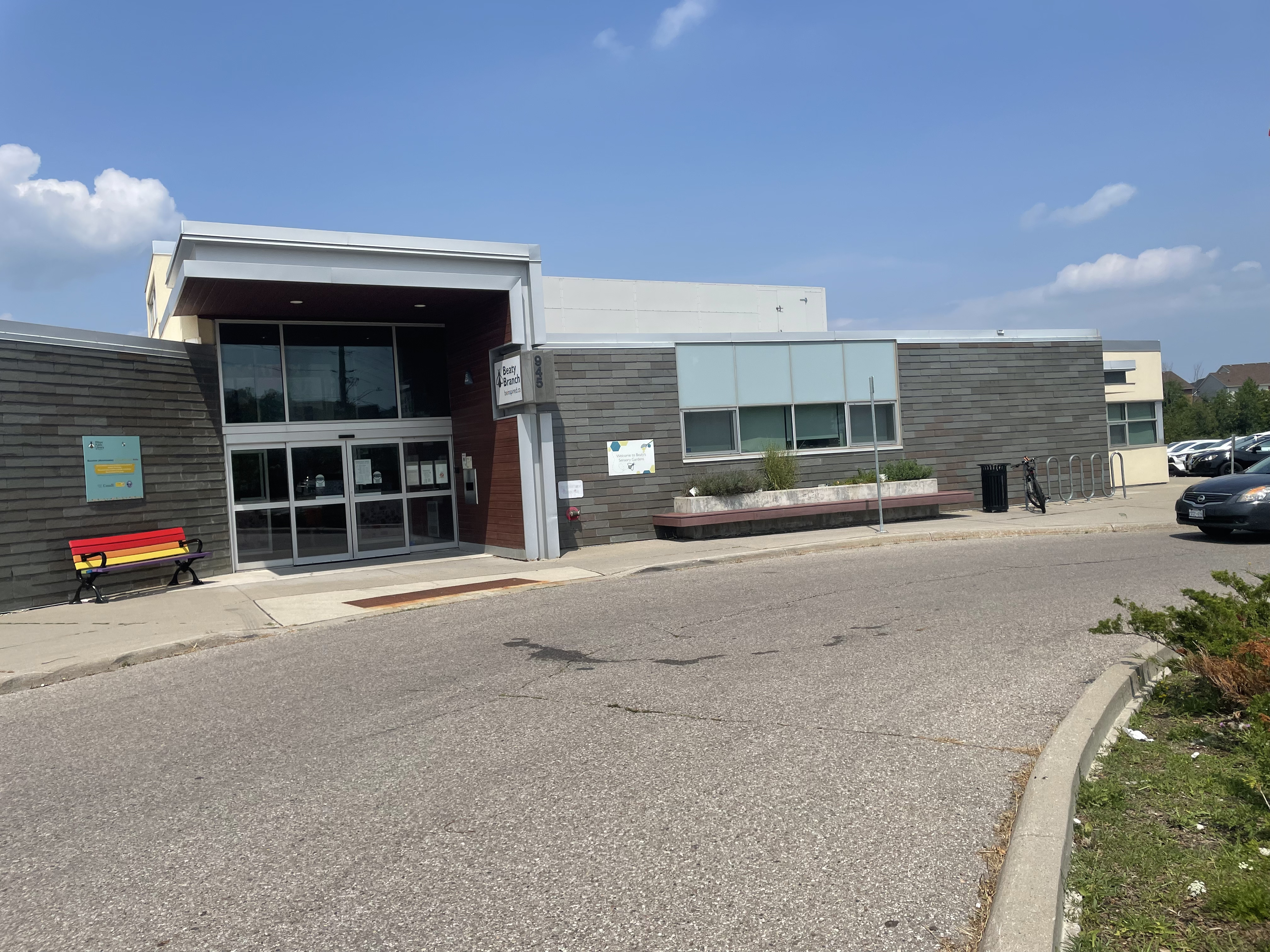
The Milton Beaty Library

Milton has three libraries: the Main Library, the Beaty Branch and the Sherwood Branch.

=== Theatre ===
The Milton Centre for the Arts, now known as FirstOntario Arts Centre, operated by the town, opened in 2012 and is a venue for events such as "music, theatre, dance, and art exhibits" in addition to special community events.

Semi-professional theatre is offered by groups such as the Milton Players who use the Arts Centre as their venue.

== Government ==
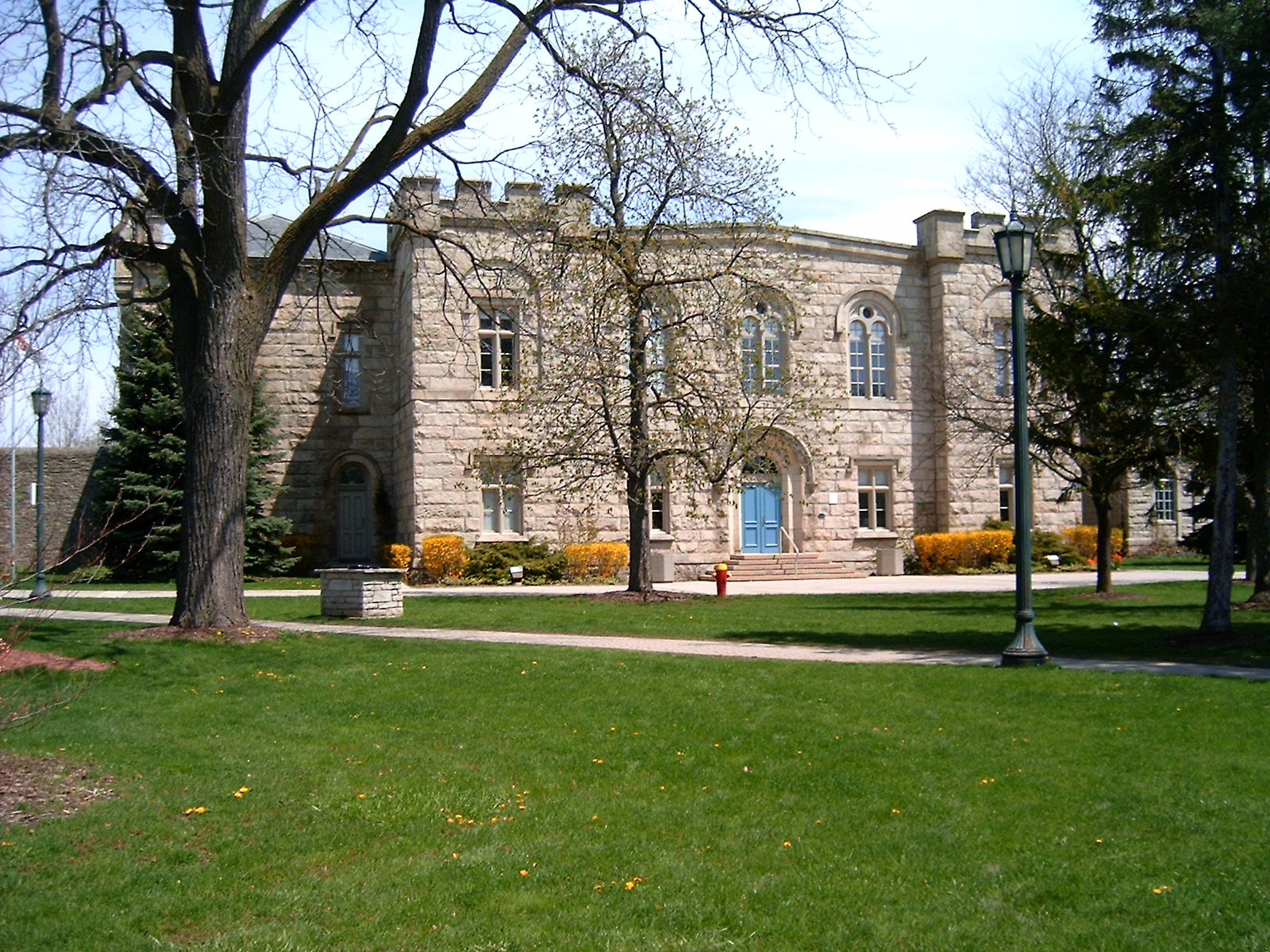
The historic Milton town hall in Victoria Park

=== Municipal ===
The Town of Milton has an elected town council headed by a mayor, and eight council members. The town is divided into four wards, each of which elect a local council representative and a Halton Region council representative. Milton is represented by the mayor and four regional councillors on the Halton Region council.

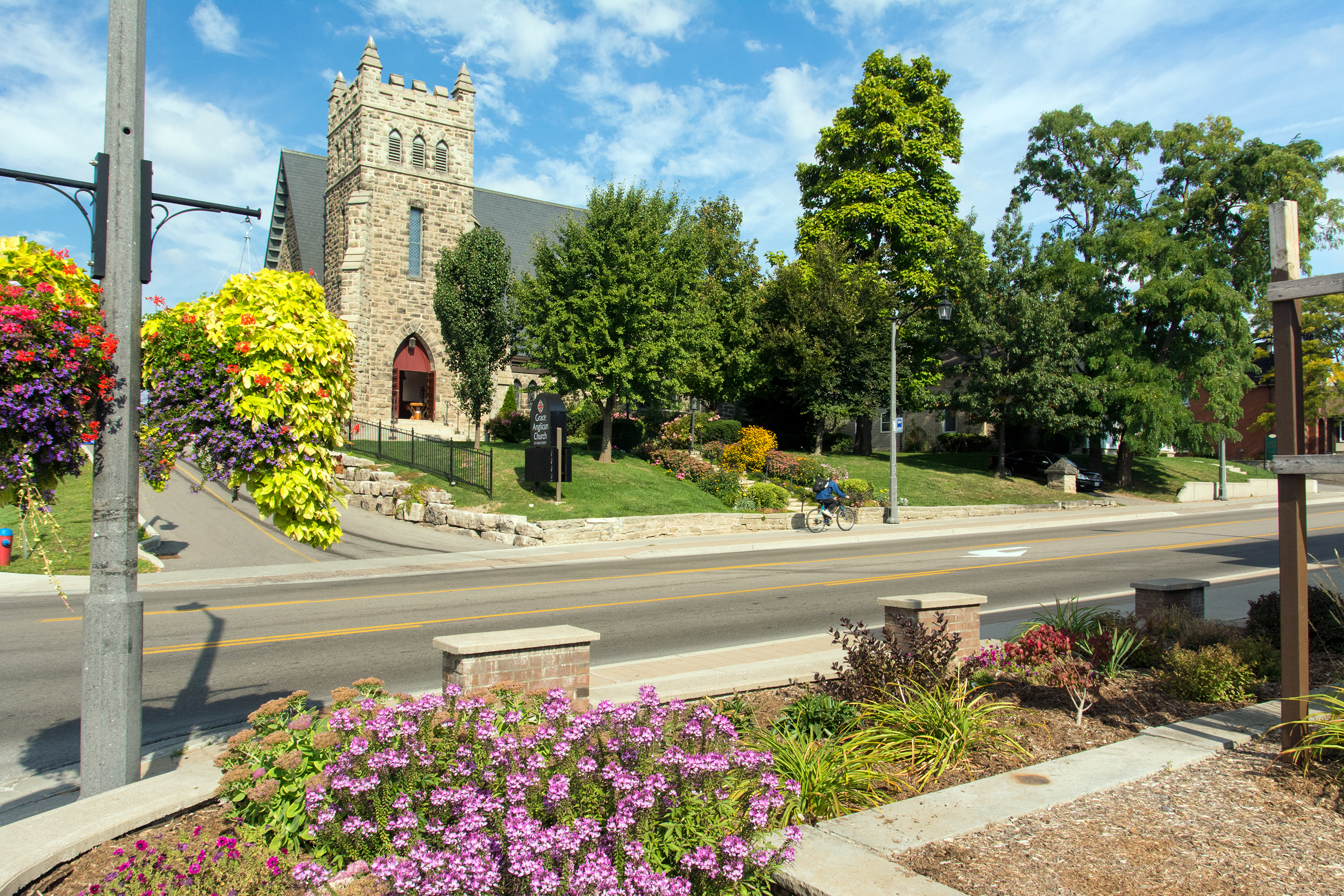
Grace Anglican Church, Milton

Town Council 2022–2026:

- Mayor: Gordon Krantz
- Regional Councillor Ward 1: Colin Best
- Regional Councillor Ward 2: Rick Malboeuf
- Regional Councillor Ward 3: Sammy Ijaz
- Regional Councillor Ward 4: Sameera Ali
- Local Councillor Ward 1: Kristina Tesser Derksen (until April 28, 2025); George Minakakis (from October 6, 2025)
- Local Councillor Ward 2: John Challinor II
- Local Councillor Ward 3: Adil Khalqi
- Local Councillor Ward 4: Sarah Marshall

Krantz has been mayor since 1980, making him the current longest-serving mayor in Canada.

=== Previous mayors ===
- George Brown, 1857
- Edward Martin, 1858–1859
- James McTuffin, 1860–1861
- William D. Lyon, 1862–1866
- George Smith, 1867–1869
- Clarkson Freeman, 1870–1872
- David Robertson, 1873–1876
- George Smith, 1877-
- John D. Matheson, 1881
- Johnson E. Harrison, Reeve (1882), Mayor of Milton (1899)
- Robert King Anderson, 1904, 1907–1909
- James Wilson Blain, 1915-1916
- Edwin Franklin Earl, 1917-1921
- John Maxted, 1928
- Edmund Syer, 1930
- George E. Elliott, 1935
- Dr. Charles Ansley "Carl" Martin, Mayor, 1936
- Adam E. Armstrong, Mayor, 1940–41
- George H. Dawson, Mayor, 1942–1946
- Gordon Gowland, Mayor, 1947
- Dr. Cecil Hartley Heslop, 1948–51, 1954–55
- G. Frank Thompson, 1952–53
- E. Ross Pearen, Deputy Reeve 1953, Mayor 1956.
- Mike Ledwith, 1957
- Sydney G. Childs, 1958–1968
- Brian Best, 1968–1974
- Anne MacArthur, 1974–1976
- Don Gordon, 1976–1980

=== Halton Regional Council ===
- Mayor: Gordon Krantz
- Local and Regional Councillor Ward 1: Colin Best
- Local and Regional Councillor Ward 2: Rick Malboeuf
- Local and Regional Councillor Ward 3: Sammy Ijaz
- Local and Regional Councillor Ward 4: Sameera Ali

=== Provincial ===
Milton federal election results
Year	Liberal		Conservative		New Democratic		Green	
2021	52%	27,723	32%	17,204	9%	4,724	2%	1,207
2019	52%	29,946	36%	20,313	7%	3,717	4%	2,529

Milton provincial election results
Year	PC		New Democratic		Liberal		Green	
2022	43%	15,733	10%	3,610	39%	14,408	4%	1,479
2018	41%	17,126	22%	9,350	30%	12,639	5%	2,046

At the provincial level of government, Milton is contained within the Milton provincial riding.

- Member of Provincial Parliament: Zee Hamid) (Liberal)

=== Federal ===
At the federal level of government, Milton is contained within the Milton federal riding.

- Member of Parliament: Adam van Koeverden (Liberal)

=== Government services ===
Policing within Milton is provided by Halton Regional Police. Fire protection is provided by the Milton Fire Department, with its five stations in the town. The Ontario Provincial Police patrol the provincially-maintained Highway 401 and privately-maintained Highway 407.

Milton is home to the Royal Canadian Mounted Police Toronto West Detachment under "O" Division with 230 RCMP personnel as of late 2018; departments include Criminal Intelligence, Federal Operations Support, Financial Crime and Serious & Organized Crime.

The first section of the Milton District Hospital opened in 1959 and expanded in 1967. A major expansion in 2016-2017 provided an extra 330,000 square feet of health-care space. The Emergency Department, for example, was tripled in size, with a new capacity of 45,000 patient visits per year. The facility is part of the Halton Healthcare system which also includes hospitals in nearby Georgetown and Oakville.

In 1972, the Ontario government started a $13.5 million construction project for the Maplehurst Correctional Centre which was completed in 1974. A $79-million makeover began in 1997 and was completed in 2001. Today, the site houses the Maplehurst Correctional Complex and the Vanier Centre for Women.

Halton Region provides the following services to it communities, including Milton:

- Economic development
- Emergency planning
- Regional planning and growth management
- Recycling and waste
- Regional roads
- Sewage (wastewater) collection systems and treatment plants
- Water purification plants and distribution systems
- Housing supports and services
- Children and parenting
- Employment and financial assistance
- Ontario Works (social services)
- Services for seniors
- Paramedic services
- Public health
- Immunizations and preventable diseases
- Food safety
- Police services

== Service clubs ==
Major service clubs include The Rotary Club of Milton, the Milton Lions Club, the Optimist Club of Milton and the Milton & District Kinsmen Club.

== Transportation ==
=== Roads ===
There are six main east-west arterial roads that are regional roads maintained by Halton Region that run through urban Milton. Three run north-south: Britannia Road, Derry Road, and Steeles Avenue, which are signposted with the numbers 6, 7, and 8 respectively. Three north-south regional roads bisect the town: Tremaine Road (22) in the west, Halton Road 25 (formerly Highway 25 and named as Ontario Street through the town's older sections and linking Milton to the Bronte district (and former town) of Oakville, and Acton to the south and north respectively). and James Snow Parkway (4) in the east. A number of improvements have been undertaken since 2009 to increase capacity and alleviate delays due to congestion and railway level crossings on these roads.

Highway 401 bisects the town and effectively separates the mainly rural and industrial areas to the north from the primarily residential and commercial developments in the southern part of town. The highway was widened to ten lanes from the James Snow Parkway to west of Regional Road 25, in a major project that started in 2019. The tolled Highway 407 runs through the rural east end and forms the boundary with Mississauga.

=== Bridges ===
A number of overpass and underpass projects have been constructed in recent years for the grade separation of railway crossings, including on Britannia Road, Derry Road, Main Street, and James Snow Parkway.

=== Public transportation ===
Milton Transit is the municipal provider of bus services for the town. Milton Transit provides conventional and Milton access+ (paratransit) service, operating seven days a week, with connections to routes and GO Transit services at the Milton GO Station.

Milton Transit has delivered service since the early 1980s in various forms. With recommendations from the North Halton Transit Strategy, Council approved the delivery of a contracted, fixed-route transit system in 2004. Milton Transit officially launched conventional service in August later that year and began purchasing its own branded buses in 2008.

Milton Transit service is provided by a private service provider under contract, PWTransit Canada, who employ bus operators and maintain Milton Transit fleet. Vehicles include 23 low floor buses for full accessibility. In 2018, the town cited 552,654 revenue passenger trips and approximately 400 active bus stops in the community.

Intercity service is served by GO Transit via buses and trains. Commuter service to and from Toronto is the key routing, with some buses connecting to Oakville. On October 31, 2009, GO Transit started service with a line from Square One Shopping Centre in Mississauga to the University of Waterloo, therefore allowing a trip to Kitchener and Cambridge.

=== Railways ===
Freight trains on the main Montreal-Toronto-Chicago CP line and a secondary CN line are a common sight in Milton. The town at present has very little passenger rail service in comparison to other GTA communities with only one-way, weekday peak-service inbound to Toronto in the morning, and outbound from Toronto in the evening. The nearest Via Rail station in the Toronto-New York City corridor is Oakville station.

The most easily accessible GO Transit railway station is Milton station.

Canadian National Railway planned to build an "intermodal" or "truck-rail hub" facility on rural land in the south of the town (bordered by Tremaine Rd., Britannia Rd. and Lower Base Line) that would be used to transfer freight between trucks and trains. According to a late-July 2019 news report, the plan was controversial with "local mayors and residents voicing objections over potential congestion and environmental impacts" because of the "estimated 1,600 daily truck trips" that the facility would require. Public hearings had been completed by that time. A three person panel was to file its recommendations by early 2020 to the Minister of Environment and Climate Change. Halton Region was also lobbying against the planned facility and stated another area of concern in late 2018:

Additionally, CN has only revealed its plans for 400 acres on the site; they have not disclosed its plans for the remaining 800 acres. We have determined that the operations at this site can be significantly expanded which will further increase the impacts on residents and the community.

=== Air ===
The nearest airport to Milton is the Burlington Airpark in neighboring Burlington, Ontario. It is a thriving general-aviation field, but the airport does not have any regular commercial passenger flight service. Some charter operations are provided.

Pearson International Airport, Canada's largest passenger-volume airport, is located only 37 kilometres (23 mi) to the east. The much smaller John C. Munro Hamilton International Airport is located 53 kilometres (33 mi) from Milton.

== Sports ==
=== Milton Sports Hall of Fame ===
Milton has a long sports history. In 2016, that history was formally recognized through a joint community-municipal project with the creation of the Milton Sports Hall of Fame. A volunteer committee was struck in 2014. The inaugural class of inductees was announced in August 2016, with the formal induction ceremony taking place on November 24, 2016. A wall of fame to recognize the inaugural inductees as well as future inductees has been constructed in the Milton Sports Centre.

=== Badminton ===
Milton Badminton Club operates up to nine courts within the in-field of the Mattamy National Cycling Centre. The club is officially affiliated with Badminton Canada and the Ontario Badminton Association, and actively participates in the district's league plays, junior circuits, as well as various Ontario tournaments. Programs are provided for players 9+ years old.

=== Tennis ===
The Town of Milton operates tennis courts in parks such as Bronte Meadows Park, Optimist Park and Rotary Outdoor Park. Private organizations are the Milton Tennis Club and the Nassagaweya Tennis Club.

=== Baseball ===
Baseball has a long history in Milton, particularly in Campbellville where it had its beginnings with the Lumberman's Baseball Club as early as 1872. It really flourished as a "community tradition" in the 1920s and 30s, and again in the 1950s and 60s with the Campbellville Intermediate Baseball Team, which won numerous county and provincial titles in a 16-year span from 1952 to 1967. A grandstand and club house was erected in 1960 in Campbellville to make room for the 2,000 spectators that would descend on the hamlet. In 1953, the Campbellville Baseball Club won the OBA Intermediate C Championship in just its second year in the league, before repeating again and again. Managed by Len Andrews, the men's Campbellville Merchants baseball team won 11 consecutive Halton county league titles, as well as 12 Ontario Championship titles between 1952 and 1967, an amazing feat for a hamlet of 300 at the time. Known as the Merchants, the intermediate men's squad (1952-67 era) was inducted into the Baseball Ontario Hall of Fame in 2014. Campbellville teams won four more provincial titles between 1968 and 1984.

Minor baseball in Milton was formally recognized through the incorporation of the Milton Minor Baseball Association as Baseball Milton in 1985. Programs range from junior t-ball all the way to midget, with house, select and rep leagues. Teams are known as the Milton Mets. In 2016, the Milton Mets major rookie team captured the boys' COBA Triple-A title.

=== Basketball ===
The Milton Stags are a youth basketball club and affiliated member club of Basketball Ontario and Basketball Canada.

=== Cricket ===
Cricket activities in Milton started in 2002 from the play fields around Bishop Reding School and later in 2012 from the turf pitch at the Boyne park. Initially, cricket was played in the T-10 format using tape tennis balls. Around 2012, Sal Saeed (president - MCGA) worked with Milton town to set up the first authentic cricket field at Sherwood park. Currently, there are multiple clubs in Milton participating in various indoor/outdoor tournaments.

=== Curling ===
Milton Curling Club is a member-owned volunteer club with four sheets of ice and is open from October to April.

=== Cycling ===
The Niagara Escarpment forms an excellent natural training ground for mountain biking and road cycling in Milton. Milton is also home to the Mattamy National Cycling Centre, opened in 2015, which includes the headquarters and practice facilities for Cycling Canada, as well as Canadian Cycling Hall of Fame.

=== Gymnastics ===
Milton Springers Gymnastics Club have existed since 1974.

=== Hockey ===
In 1942, the Milton Bricks Tigers won an OHA Junior "C" title. Milton defeated Oakville to advance to the semi-finals and Parry Sound to move on to the finals against the Preston Riversides. In the Schmalz Cup best of three series, which was held at Maple Leaf Gardens, Milton won game one by a score of 6-4, with three goals coming from Milton's future NHL player Enio Sclisizzi, and game two by a score of 10-1. This victory came on the heels of a loss in the finals three years earlier versus Aurora.

NHLer and four-time Stanley Cup champion John Tonelli is the most well-known hockey player to come from Milton. There is a Milton arena named in his honour. NHL referee Bruce Hood and linesman Leon Stickle are also Milton products.

A banner hockey year came in 1976 when the Milton Tridents Intermediate B team won the Southern Counties league championship over the Tillsonburg Maroons in seven games, and the Docs and Dents minor atom team won the OMHA Central Ontario zone championship. The Docs and Dents were the first Milton minor hockey team to go undefeated in the Tri-County league, winning 26 games and tying two.

The Milton Icehawks were a Junior "A" ice hockey team in the Ontario Junior A Hockey League. They are one of the most historical teams in the Ontario Junior Hockey League, having been formed in 1966.

Trucking magnate Brad Grant purchased the team in the late 1980s when it seemed like the organization might fold, and led the team to tremendous success in the late 1990s. During his 15-year ownership run, the team captured four division crowns, three league championships and a provincial title. In 2001, Grant sold the team to an Oakville trio that consisted of ex-NHLer Dave Gagner, Mario Forgione, who owned the Mississauga IceDogs at the time and was an automotive parts manufacturing president, and wine distillery consultant Ken Chase.

For the 2003–04 season, Forgione changed the team's name from the Merchants to the IceHawks to reflect the team's connection with the local minor hockey programs called the Winterhawks, and Forgione's ownership of the Mississauga IceDogs. In 2006, Forgione officially affiliated the Icehawks with the IceDogs.

In the spring of 2006, ex-NHL goaltender Rick Heinz' attempt to purchase the nearby Tier-2 Junior Georgetown Raiders fell through, but by July 2006 the local Campbellville resident Heinz had talked Forgione into selling the Icehawks, and the affiliation with the IceDogs ended. Heinz sold the team just nine months later after starting the season with essentially no committed players. Dean Piett, a commercial real estate businessman from Burlington, and Rob DeVincentis, the Ancaster owner of a construction business, purchased the team from Heinz and have owned the team ever since the sale in 2007. Both Piett and DeVincetis had a son playing on the team in 2008, which led to friction amongst other players.

The Icehawks (2003–2018) have previously been known as the Milton Flyers (1979–1981), Milton Steamers (1981–1986), and Milton Merchants (1986–2003). Many notable players have suited up for Milton over the years, including NHL stars John Tavares, Daniel Carcillo, Sam Gagner, Rich Peverley, Darren Haydar and Matt Read.

The new Milton Menace Hockey Club, a Junior A hockey franchise, was formed from the Newmarket Hurricane team, purchased in early March 2019. The 2019–2020 season was the club's first, with games at the Milton Memorial Arena.

=== Running ===
Milton was represented by distance runner Ed Whitlock, who held numerous age-related records for the marathon, half-marathon and long-distance track events, both indoor and outdoor. Milton's Ben Preisner represented Canada at the 2020 Summer Olympics in Tokyo.

=== Skating ===
The town offers drop-in skating at several arenas; some of those also feature competitive skating events. Private organizations include the Milton Skating Club and Milton Speed Skating.

In 1976, Milton's Kevin Parker won a Canadian national novice skating title in London.

=== Skiing ===
The Niagara Escarpment forms an excellent natural training ground for skiing in Milton. It is also the site of Glen Eden ski area, where Olympian and Miltonian Travis Gerrits got his start.

=== Soccer ===
Milton soccer is represented by the Milton Youth Soccer Club. MYSC was incorporated in 1988 and has been serving the town of Milton ever since. It is a non-profit, volunteer organization. The club has over 3,300 players who play house-league, development and rep each year. Ages for teams range from U4 to U18 and including adult.

The Milton Magic soccer team of the Youth Soccer Club competes in various Soccer Ontario events. In 2019, their BU15 and BU16 Blue teams advanced into the Ontario Cup Finals.

Halton Hawks FC is the smallest of the Youth Clubs in Milton. HHFC was incorporated in 2002, is a non-profit organization. and operates out of Bennett Park, in the heart of Milton. Halton Hawks FC is an Ontario Soccer Association sanctioned Club. HHFC is an official Academy of Tranmere Rovers FC an English second division soccer Club. HHFC offers programs for development and rep each year. Ages for teams U7-U17.

Milton SC are currently representing Milton in the Canadian Soccer League after joining the league in the 2014 season. Milltown Football Club was a soccer club based in Milton, playing in Division 1 of the Peel Halton Soccer League. Milltown FC joined the Canadian Soccer League in the 2010 season as an expansion club but opted out of the league after one season due to disagreement over membership terms and conditions.

=== Swimming ===
The Milton Marlins are youth-focused swim team based out of the Milton Sports Centre. Coach and swim trainer Carole Murray was instrumental in teaching thousands of kids in Milton how to swim from the 1970s until she sold her swim school in 2006. She won a coach of the year award from the federal government in 1988. She was also a coach for the Marlins. Under her watch Campbellville's Alicia Hicken competed in the Canadian Olympic Trials and Canadian Winter Nationals in 1991.

As of November 2019, the head coach of the club was Meghan Whittaker.

Some Marlins swimmers qualified for the Olympic Trials for the 2016 Rio Olympics.

== Parks and recreation ==
Milton has many conservation parks, campgrounds and recreational areas. The conservation parks in the Milton area are owned by Conservation Halton, a conservation authority.

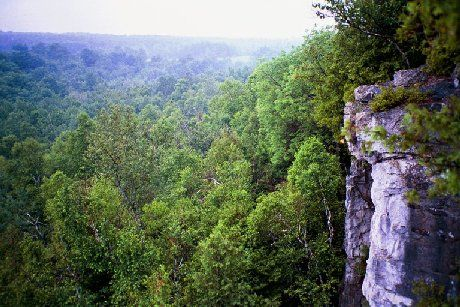
View from the Niagara Escarpment near Rattlesnake Point

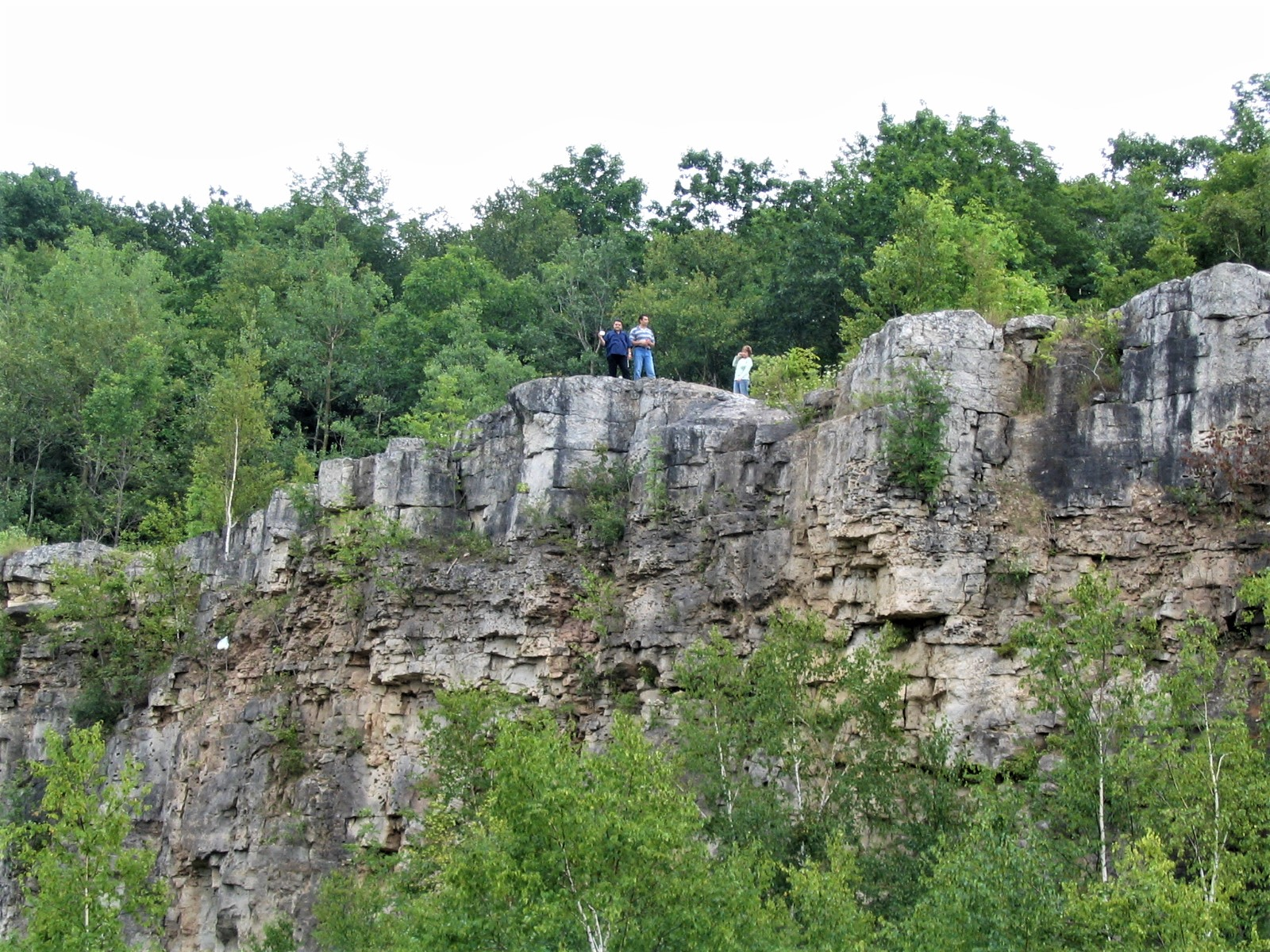
Kelso Conservation Area

- Bruce Trail
- Conservation Halton
- Crawford Lake Conservation Area
- Drumquin Park BMX track & Oakville Model Flying Club
- Glen Eden Ski & Snowboard Centre
- John Tonelli Sports Centre
- Kelso Conservation Area
- Milton Curling Club
- Milton Minor Hockey Association (Milton Winterhawks)
- Milton Mill Pond & Rotary Park
- Milton Heights Campgrounds
- Milton Leisure Centre
- Milton Memorial Arena
- Milton Skating Club
- Milton Sports Centre Arena
- Mohawk Raceway
- Mount Nemo Conservation Area
- Mountsberg Conservation Area
- Rattlesnake Point
- Rotary Park
- Springridge Farm

== Media ==
Milton is covered by local newspapers, radio, magazines and websites through the following services:

- The Canadian Champion
- Milton Villager
- Milton Reporter
- Milton Today
- YourTV Halton
- The GTA Times
- FM 101 Milton CJML

== Local events ==
- Every Labour Day weekend the Milton Steam-Era takes place. Steam-Era is the annual show produced by the "Ontario Steam & Antique Preservers Association," currently held on 88 acres at County Heritage Park, after decades at the Milton Fairgrounds. Steam engines from the 19th century puff their way around the grounds. Hundreds of tractors and stationary engines, along with antique cars, models and agricultural displays recreate life in the country 100 years ago. The 2020 event will celebrate the 60th anniversary of Steam-Era.
- The Milton Fall Fair is held every year on the last weekend of September. The Fall Fair has been a tradition in the town for over 160 years. Events include an agricultural show, midway, livestock, entertainment, the Demolition Derby and other traditional county fair events. The event takes place at the Milton Fairgrounds located in the historic downtown area of Milton.
- Culture Days is a weekend long celebration of arts and culture in Milton featuring free interactive events for all ages and held during the last weekend of September. Organized by Arts Milton, Culture Days is held each year at the FirstOntario Arts Centre.
- A farmers' market operates on Main Street in downtown Milton on Saturdays 8am-Noon, from May through October. The section of Main Street that hosts the market is closed off to vehicles during the event.
- The Downtown Milton Street Festival - annual event in June attracts over 90,000 people and includes live entertainment, vendors and local businesses.
- Miracle on Main Street - Tiger Jeet Singh Foundation's annual toy drive.

== Development ==
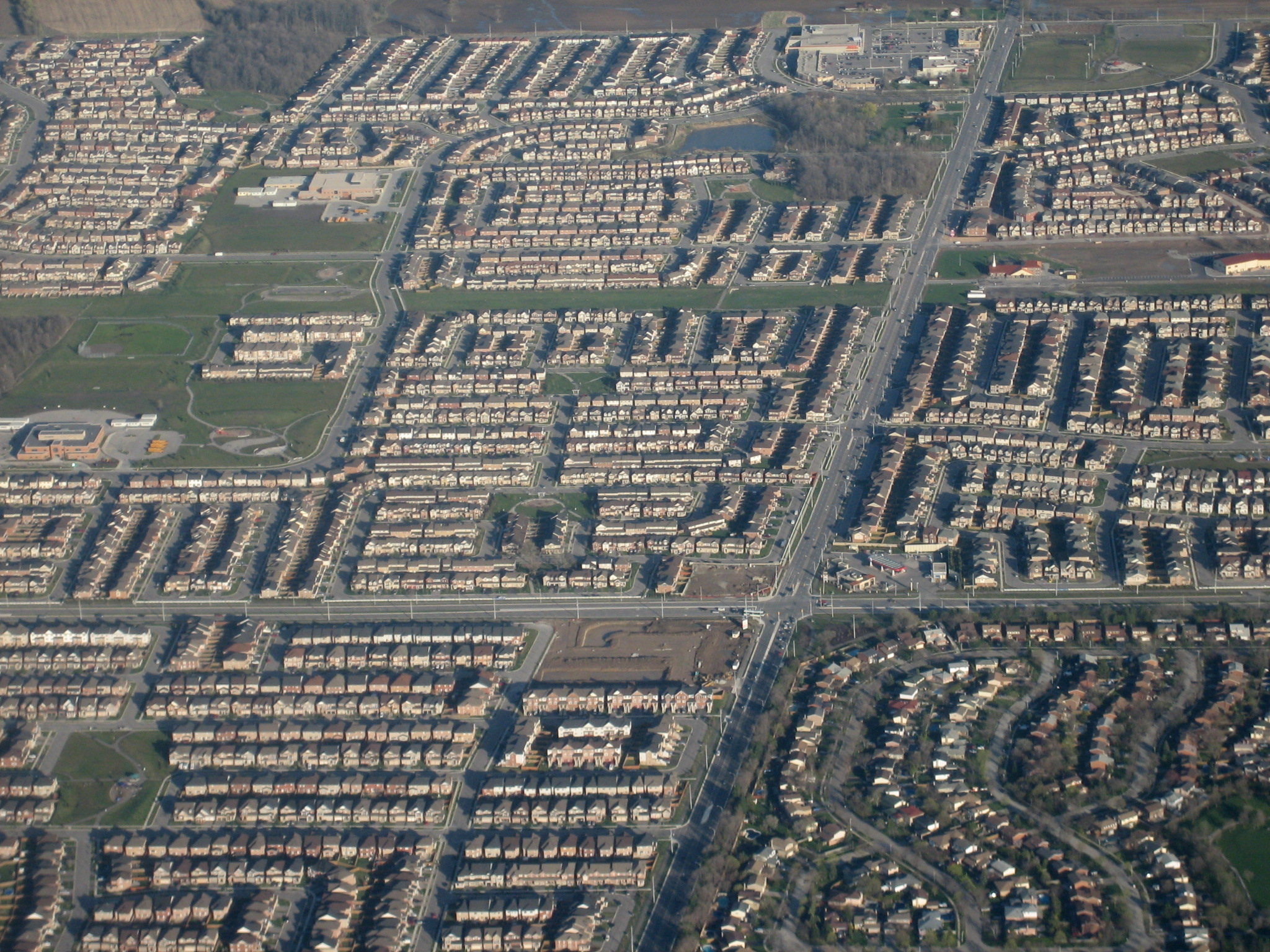
New developments near Derry Road

The town has very easy access throughout the GTA by Highways 401 and 407 towards Oakville, Burlington and Hamilton on the town, or by the former Highway 25 (Halton Road 25). There are two key freight railway routes (both by CN and CP), passenger services from GO Transit, and Via Rail passenger connections in the Quebec City–Windsor Corridor in both neighbouring Oakville and Georgetown. There is close proximity to Toronto Pearson International Airport along Highway 401 (under 40 km from 401/Halton 25 exit).

Milton Transit was developed in 1972 to provide public transportation service throughout the urban centre, as well as a feeder route for GO Transit trains and buses.

While most of the development is suburban in nature, larger industrial lots are being developed closer to the escarpment. The major industries in Milton are automotive, advanced manufacturing, distribution and food production.

The town published a Current Development Map and also a Future Urban Structure Map - Building Possibility document that indicates the general plan for the use of lands in future, intended to "minimize further expansion of urban areas and unnecessary and inefficient consumption of land".

=== 1970s growth ===
In 1978, the Ontario Municipal Board approved the Alliance Ex-Urban project, paving the way for a 532-unit plan, which broke ground with an initial 180 houses at Bronte St. and Derry Rd. in 1979.

A further 600 detached and semi-detached houses were completed in 1979, as Timberlea moved into phase two of its construction. Phase One saw 300 homes built in the Timberlea area bounded by Derry Rd., Thompson Rd. and Ontario St. S. The final Timberlea village includes 1,400 homes.

An additional 30 homes were built in 1979 by Kingsway Plastering on Commercial St, and 10 new units in Campbellville's McLaren Subdivision. A 107-unit apartment complex was also completed in 1979 on Millside Drive.

Building permit totals in 1976 reached $28 million, before dipping in 1977, and rebounding to nearly $23 million in 1978. In 1979, the estimated total building permit revenue reached $100 million.

By 1979, the town zoning administrator stated that, due to drinking water limitations at the time, completion of the Timberlea and Alliance projects would "complete all the residential development that can go into the town." For the next 20 years, very little growth occurred in Milton.

=== 21st century ===
Residential growth has increased substantially since 2002 due to completion of "The Big Pipe" project, designed to deliver water to the town from Lake Ontario. Since then, Milton developed an initial seven new subdivisions, including Hawthorne Village, and several new ones are under development by Mattamy Homes and various other builders. Multiple new grade schools have been built, as well as the Crossroads Centre shopping plaza that includes various major retail stores and restaurants. An eight-screen movie theatre is operated by Cineplex Entertainment under their Galaxy Cinemas brand and opened on June 30, 2006.

In July 2014, Milton council approved 11 new residential applications that will see an additional 6,000 homes built, increasing the population by roughly 25,000 new residents. In 2013-14, Milton approved construction of a track-cycling velodrome venue for the 2015 Pan American Games called the Mattamy National Cycling Centre. The facility sits at the heart of a 150-acre plot of land that is designated for a proposed future Wilfrid Laurier University campus.

A mid 2019 report stated that roughly 3,100 high-density residential units were being planned or being built in the town.

A mid-2019 report discussed two new subdivisions being planned, Agerton (along Trafalgar Road east of the 401), "for a mixed-use employment and higher-density residential community" and Trafalgar, a "mixed-use, transit-supportive, higher-density community ... along Trafalgar Road between Derry Road to south of Britannia Road". The 400-acre (160 ha) Milton Education Village area was to be further developed, as an urban neighbourhood with post-secondary education, residential, commercial and recreational segments.

==== Official Plan ====
As of November 2019, the town was using the Official Plan approved by Halton Region on December 14, 1997, and by the Ontario Municipal Board (OMB) on July 19, 1999. Public meetings were scheduled for late 2019 to obtain residents' comments on changes that might be appropriate for the next Official Plan.

== Commerce ==
The villages of Milton Heights and Peru are unique in Milton, as they were the centres of industrial rather than farming communities. This has given this part of Milton a unique character that has left a legacy in the buildings and people that remain in the area. From the 1850s and '60s until 1877, a lumber mill operated in the area, as well as a saw mill in the mid-1800s. The railway fueled industry when it opened in 1879 in Milton.

The area was traditionally famous for quarrying and the production of building materials such as lime, limestone and bricks, which started in the 1880s. These industries were of provincial significance and, at their peak at the turn of the 20th century, they employed hundreds of people in the Milton Heights and Peru areas.

In addition, the materials that were produced here were used in many of the buildings in both urban and rural Milton as well as in buildings throughout Ontario. These were huge industrial operations for their time and they attracted considerable immigration to Milton.

Early industry in Milton consisted of the Milton Pressed Brick Company, which started in the 1880s, and the P.L. Robertson screw factory, which started in 1908.

An August 2017 report indicated that Mattamy Homes' Halton/Hamilton Divisional Office was located in Milton. Other companies with Canadian head offices, or a major employment presence, in Milton include:

- 3M Canada
- Chudleigh's Limited
- Dare Foods
- DSV Canada
- Dufferin Aggregates Milton Quarry
- Gordon Food Service (592 employees)
- Johnson Controls
- Karmax Heavy Stamping, a division of Magna International (950 employees)
- Lowe's distribution centre
- Manheim Auto Auctions (750 employees)
- Modatek Systems, a division of Magna International
- Northstar Aerospace
- Rockwool (formerly branded as Roxul)
- Whirlpool Canada
- Wolseley Canada distribution centre

A 2017 summary of the benefits of Milton as a location for industry stated that the town's "proximity to the 400-series highways, rail links, and international airports, as well as the municipality's commitment to economic development, have all helped drive Milton's dynamic growth".

The town's mid-2019 report highlighted three major new facilities in Milton: Kimberly-Clark's 514,000 square feet (47,800 m^{2}) of warehouse and distribution, Prologis' 160,000 square feet (15,000 m^{2}) of warehouse space leased to Jaguar Land Rover and Sun Life Financial's planned 595,000 square feet (55,300 m^{2}) of speculative industrial building. At that time, the town had an inventory of 21,460,020 square feet (1,993,701 m^{2}) of industrial space, with only 2.7% being unoccupied.

The mid-2019 report also listed new businesses that had opened facilities in town in 2018: PBS Systems Group, Infrastructure Ontario, Enable Education, Responsive Consulting and Throwback Entertainment. At that time, the Derry Green Business Park Development was underway; the plan was to "accommodate a mix of businesses including innovative logistics, advanced manufacturing and distribution facilities" in this new area.

=== Town finances ===
The town's 2018 Budget report stated that gross revenue for 2018 was $187.2 million and that expenses totaled $118.1 million; much of the net revenue came from charges made to developers. Financial assets totaled $106.3 million at year's end, while liabilities totaled $12.6 million. Milton's long-term debenture debt decreased to $42.7 million.

== Notable people ==
- Scott Burnside, journalist and sportswriter
- Ernie Coombs, star of children's TV program Mr. Dressup
- Susan Delacourt, political journalist
- David James Elliott, actor on CBS show JAG
- Ben Gulak, inventor best known for creating the Uno, an eco-friendly, electric-powered vehicle
- Colonel Chris Hadfield, astronaut
- George Sherwood Hume, geologist
- P. L. Robertson, inventor of the Robertson socket-head screw and screwdriver
- Michael Rowe, award-winning Canadian journalist, essayist, and novelist

=== Music ===
- Danny Brooks, blues and Memphis-style R&B musician
- Deadmau5, progressive house music producer and performer
- The Most Serene Republic, indie band signed to Arts & Crafts

=== Politics and public service ===
- Robert Baldwin, MP of Upper Canada
- Ernest Charles Drury, 8th Premier of Ontario
- Otto Jelinek, federal politician; represented Halton and Oakville; world champion and Olympic figure skater
- Betty Kennedy, broadcaster, journalist, author, and retired Canadian Senator
- Joseph Martin, 13th Premier of British Columbia
- Benjamin Franklin McGregor, farmer and political figure in Saskatchewan
- Mark Saunders, Chief of Police, Toronto Police Service
- James Snow, politician and Ontario's longest serving Minister of Transportation
- Adam van Koeverden, Canadian gold medal sprint kayaker and politician

=== Sports ===
- Kayla Alexander, WNBA player
- Kyle Alexander (born 1996), basketball player for Hapoel Tel Aviv of the Israeli Basketball Premier League
- Scott Bertoli, hockey player
- Steve Bice, curler
- Kwaku Boateng, football player, graduated from Bishop Reding
- Mat Clark, hockey player
- Megan Carter, hockey defenceman
- Jeff Daw, hockey forward
- Darren Eliot, hockey goaltender and Olympian
- Mark French, hockey coach
- Travis Gerrits, Olympic aerial skier and 2013 world silver medalist
- Brad Grant, former owner of the Milton Icehawks; standardbred horse owner
- Darren Haydar, hockey player
- Noelle Henning, soccer player
- Shawn Hill, baseball pitcher, attended Bishop Reding Catholic Secondary School
- Bruce Melvin Hood, hockey referee
- Bob Izumi, TV personality and professional angler
- Mike Kaszycki, hockey player
- Peter McDuffe, hockey player
- Joey Melo, soccer player
- Matt O'Meara, football player
- Pierre Pilote, hockey player
- Ben Preisner, Olympic marathoner
- Jim Ridley, baseball player and MLB scout
- Ronald Roberts, WHA and NHL hockey executive
- Enio Sclisizzi, former NHL player
- Matt Sewell, football player
- Michael Sgarbossa, hockey player
- Tiger Ali Singh, professional wrestler
- Tiger Jeet Singh, professional wrestler
- Harvey Sproule, hockey player, coach, owner, executive, and referee; curler; journalist; race horse owner
- Leon Stickle, NHL linesman
- John Tonelli, hockey player
- Kirsten Wall, curler and Olympic gold medallist
- Steve Webb, hockey player
- Madeline Schizas, three-time Canadian National Champion singles figure skater and 2022 Winter Olympian
- Ed Whitlock, oldest person in the world to run a marathon under three hours

== Sister cities ==
- Santa Maria, Bulacan, Philippines (since July 6, 1999)
