= Andrew Mercer Reformatory for Women =

Prison in Canada

Coordinates: 43°38′20″N 79°25′23″W

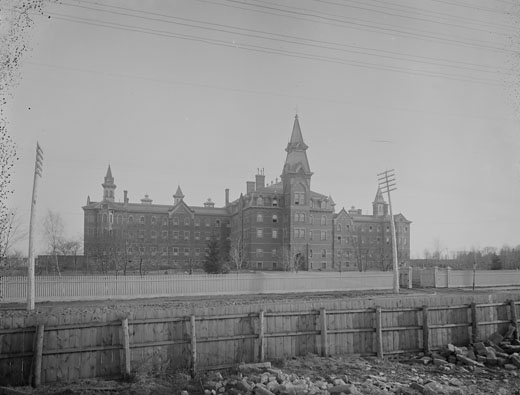
- Interactive map of Andrew Mercer Reformatory for Women
- Location: Toronto, Ontario, Canada
- Status: Closed
- Opened: August 8, 1880
- Closed: April 3, 1969
- Managed by: Jean Burrows (1950)

The Andrew Mercer Reformatory for Women was a women's (16 years of age or older) prison in Toronto, Ontario, Canada. At various times, the facility was also known as the Mercer Complex, Andrew Mercer Reformatory for Females, and Andrew Mercer Ontario Reformatory for Females.

Located on King Street West in Toronto, Ontario, the Mercer Reformatory opened in 1880. The complex was composed of two institutions: The Mercer Reformatory for adult women and the Industrial Refuge for Girls for those under 14. It would later include facilities for drug treatment and psychiatric disorders. The complex would stand until 1969, when it was demolished and replaced by other institutions.

Originally intended to provide reform possibilities, including curing alcoholism, the facility developed a notorious reputation during its lifetime. There were documented cases of torture, beatings and illegal medical procedures, including drug experimentation. There were several riots at the facility.

== Construction ==
It was situated west of downtown Toronto, on the grounds of the farm of the provincial asylum located to the north on Queen Street. The main building, four-storeys tall, oriented north-south was 110 feet (34 m) long and 65 feet (20 m) wide with a 90 feet (27 m) tower at the front, which served as the main entrance. There were three-storey east and west wings each being 118 feet (36 m) long and 52 feet (16 m) wide. To the rear were two-storey buildings holding the boilers and a workshop. There were two open areas for prisoners to have outdoor time. The building was red brick in a Gothic Revival style. The building was designed by architect Kivas Tully of the Ontario Department of Public Works. It held 147 regular cells and 49 in the basement, to be used for punishment, and could hold 250 prisoners. It was partially built by prisoners from the nearby Toronto Central Prison.

The cost of construction was CA$90,000 ($3.09 million in 2025 dollars). The funds for the building came from the estate of Andrew Mercer, who died intestate and his estate in the amount of CA$140,000 ($4.81 million in 2025 dollars) ended up in the coffers of the Province of Ontario. The other portion of Andrew Mercer's estate was used for an Eye and Ear Infirmary at Toronto General Hospital.

== Purpose ==
At first, the Reformatory was primarily focussed on keeping women with alcoholic addictions or living a life of vice off the streets for terms of six months. It had a separate section (a "refuge") for girls under 14 years of age, keeping them separate from the older population. The separate area (later for those 16 years and younger) was known as the Industrial Refuge for Girls from 1880 to 1905 and the Ontario Training School for Girls from 1952 to 1960. The refuge was intended for girls who were orphans, found homeless or begging, considered uncontrollable by her parents, or who had become wards of the province due to alcoholic or otherwise neglectful parents.

The reformatory had the idealistic promise of a "home-like" atmosphere for its inmates. One of the major tenets of the reformatory was to instill feminine Victorian virtues such as obedience and servility. Work, such as cooking, baking, and cleaning, was also a major part of prison life. According to one superintendent of the reformatory, "of all wretched women the idle are the most wretched. We try to impress upon them the importance of labour, and we look upon this as one of the great means of their reformation."

Despite its idealistic beginnings, the Andrew Mercer Reformatory for Women would become the center of controversy with allegations of torture, beatings, experimental drugs, and medical procedures, all in the name of reform. Over time, the Mercer Reformatory changed, becoming a full-time adult women's prison housing violent prisoners as well as the "incorrigibles", and those needing treatment for alcoholic and other addictions, or psychiatric disorders.

== History ==
In July 1878, the Ontario government announced the construction of the Mercer Reformatory as one use of the Andrew Mercer funds and expected its completion by the end of 1879. This was followed in March 1879, by the Ontario Legislature passing An Act Respecting the Andrew Mercer Ontario Reformatory for Females (Statutes of Ontario 1879, Chap. 38) to govern it. The Reformatory was to receive and reform women over the age of sixteen convicted of an offence for which a short term sentence of over 30 days to under two years was imposed. The Reformatory was completed and opened on August 28, 1880. The legislature passed at the same time An Act to establish an Industrial Refuge for Girls to be located in a section of Mercer Reformatory.

An 1891 report by the Ontario Inspector of Public Prisons and Charities illustrated the difference between the women's reformatory and the nearby men's Central Prison over the span of 1881-1890. Over 78% of female inmates were incarcerated for "crimes against public morals and the peace", (such as prostitution) while only 37% of the men were incarcerated for similar offenses. Only 22% of female inmates were for "crimes against the person and against property" while 63% of the men were incarcerated for those offenses. Only 48% of the Mercer inmates could read and write, compared to a 92% rate amongst women in Toronto at the time. A common disease among the women was syphilis, which led to a separate ward for syphilis at the reformatory. A report in the 1880s described "disease-ridden inmates, deaths and still-born infants in the nursery."

In 1893, An Act respecting Houses of Refuge for Females was passed governing incarceration in the Reformatory. In 1913, the Female Refuges Act was passed in Ontario. In 1919, the act was amended and expanded the terms by which a woman could be incarcerated at Mercer. Any parent or guardian could bring before a judge any woman under the age of twenty-one years who was deemed unmanageable or incorrigible by the adult person, so that the judge could decide the woman's fate. Under Section 17 of the Act, any person could bring before a judge any woman under the age of thirty-five, who was found begging or a habitual drunkard, or simply pregnant without being married, and potentially have her committed. These women and girls were committed to the reformatory for a term of up to five years, later reduced to a maximum term of two years.

In 1947, Kay Sanford, a reporter at The Globe and Mail produced a three-part report in the newspaper about conditions in Mercer. According to Mercer superintendent Jean Milne revealed that inmates would be hooked on cigarettes. The cigarettes could then be used as incentive for good behavior. Milne also discussed how psychology was increasingly used instead of "old-time beating of unruly inmates" as a method of controlling behavior.

On June 25, 1948, one hundred women rioted in the Reformatory. It was not the first riot, one was noted to have happened 12 years before. The inmates were subdued by 75 police officers of the Toronto and Ontario police forces. The riot began after breakfast in the dining room the morning after a 17-year-old young woman had been placed in solitary confinement. The women held a sit-down strike demanding the release of the young woman. The police were called, and after it appeared that inmates were trying to break down a dining room door to the outside, stormed the room. Fighting ensued as the police forcibly returned the women to their cells. At the time, the Reformatory was the only penal institution for women in Ontario and housed 159 inmates with sentences ranging from alcoholism to attempted murder.

In 1953, reporter Frank Tupane of The Globe and Mail visited the Reformatory along with MPP J. Stewart, in response to allegations of physical abuse. He confirmed the existence of the solitary confinement block in the basement, examined it, but held it was not "The Black Hole of Calcutta" as alleged. He asked about the allegations of physical abuse, and Reformatory Superintendent Jean Burrows stated that there had not been any whippings since 1948. The administration of corporal punishment was no longer done because Burrows felt it was unconstructive and that she would have to apply to the Department of Reform Institutions in each individual case.

In 1955, the Ontario Women's Treatment Centre was set up on site for the treatment of alcoholism, drug addiction and psychiatric disorders. It was relocated to Brampton in 1963. In 1959, the Ontario Women's Guidance Centre opened in 1959 in Brampton and concentrated on academic and vocational training. Along with the reformatory, the institutions made up what was then referred to as the Mercer Complex.

In 1964, the same year the Female Refuges Act was repealed, a grand jury was convened to investigate the reformatory, and was brought to prominence by The Toronto Daily Star's front-page headline "Secret visit to Toronto dungeons: Girls' Jail Shocks Grand Jury". The grand jury's conclusions included finding medical care so bad that "we could find no one with anything good to say about it." The jury also found that the rehabilitation process was so nonexistent that "the name of the institution should be changed to jail, since it is in no sense a reform institution." Dungeon-like basement "bucket cells" used for solitary confinement were 1.2 metres (3.9 ft) by just over 2 metres (6.6 ft), with no windows or lights.

Although the grand jury's report was challenged at the time by the Ontario Minister of Reform Institutions, Allan Grossman, Toronto Star reporter Lotta Dempsey wrote that the paper's files were "full of stories of escapes from Mercer, harsh treatment of expectant mothers, riots", and more.

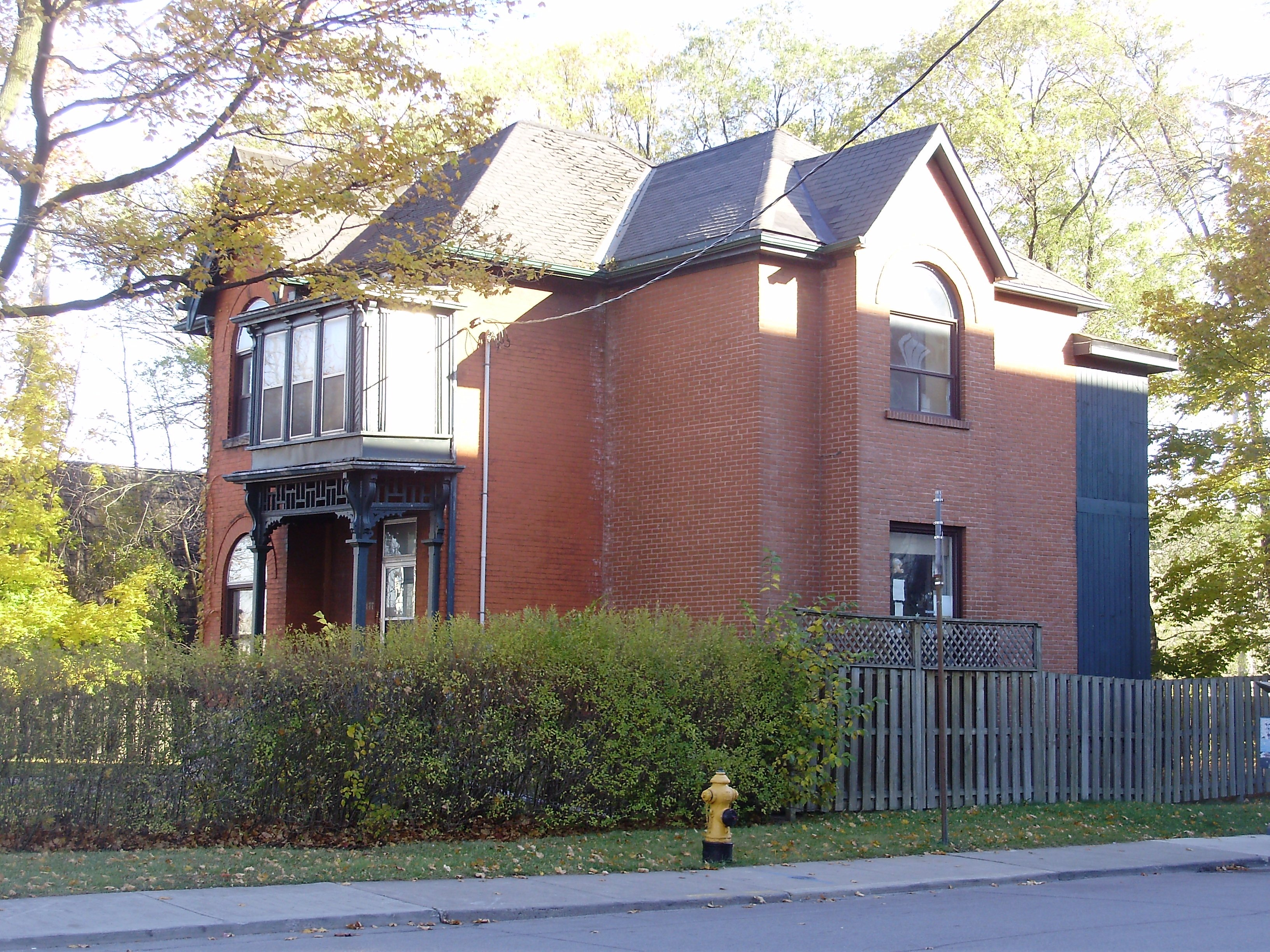
The original Mercer Reformatory superintendent's house survives at Fraser and King.

In July 1966, the Reformatory was the site of another riot. In steaming hot conditions, fifteen inmates of the 88 housed at the time fought amongst themselves, while the others remained in their cells. The riot began in a third-floor dormitory, moved to the second floor and ended in the Protestant Chapel on the third floor of the building. Sixty Metro Toronto Police officers quelled the riot. Four women were transferred to the Don Jail and three sent to Toronto Western Hospital. According to Reformatory Superintendent G. R. Thompson, the riot was sparked when a woman who was receiving medication was removed to an outside hospital. The woman had attempted suicide and was demanding stronger drugs, which other inmates were hoping to obtain from her. According to police officers, another cause was "jealousy among lesbians."

In April 1969, the reformatory was closed, officially replaced by the Vanier Centre for Women in Brampton, which merged the three institutions of the Mercer Complex. The reformatory building was demolished later that year. All of the inmates were transferred to the Vanier Centre.

Today, the site where the old reformatory existed is now the Allan Lamport Stadium. All that remains from the original site is the superintendent's house at the corner of King Street and Fraser Avenue.

== Abuses ==
"Under the Female Refuges Act, the province of Ontario from 1896-1964 arrested and jailed, without trial or appeal, females from 16 to 35 whom magistrates suspected of undesirable social behaviour -- i.e. being involved in interracial relationships or general promiscuity or having a child out of wedlock. Males were deemed "incorrigible" only for theft." The Mercer Reformatory was one of the institutions they were sent to and where questionable medical experiments were performed on these women without their informed consent.

Constance Backhouse, a Canadian legal scholar and historian specializing in gender and race discrimination, has presented cases related to the abuses inflicted on women in these institutions in many legal forums. Among these cases is that of Velma Demerson and Muriel Walker, two of the many women who were subjected to several involuntary medical procedures by a reformatory doctor, a leading eugenics practitioner searching for evidence of physical deficiencies contributing to the moral defectives of "unmanageable women".

Velma Demerson was arrested in 1939, at age 18, for living with her Chinese boyfriend. By the wishes of her family, she was arrested and taken to Belmont Home, a residence for "incorrigibles", before being imprisoned at Mercer. After release from Mercer, Demerson married the father of her child. He was a Chinese immigrant, which under the citizenship law of that period automatically annulled her Canadian citizenship. Velma was one of the only survivors who, 60 years after her incarceration at the Andrew Mercer Reformatory in 1939, received compensation from the Ontario government. She was 81 by then. In 2004, she wrote a book about the events titled Incorrigible, which is part of the Life Writing Series from Wilfrid Laurier University Press. In 2002, she was awarded the J.S. Woodsworth Prize for anti-racism by the New Democratic Party of Canada.

Muriel Walker was a young Blackfoot woman working on a promising ballet career. Walker also was jailed under the Female Refuges Act, charged with being incorrigible. Muriel was also subjected to medical experimentation while incarcerated. Senator Kim Pate and CBC helped get her son Robert Burke closure and recognition for his torture as an infant in the Andrew Mercer Reformatory. As a four-month-old child, Robert was brutally beaten while being cared for by the matrons of the Andrew Mercer Reformatory.

== See also ==
- List of provincial correctional facilities in Ontario

== In popular media ==
- Marshall, Heather J. (2026). Liberty Street. Doubleday Canada. ISBN 9780385700511. - a novel partially set in the Reformatory
