= Velma Demerson =

Canadian activist (1920–2019)

Velma Demerson (September 4, 1920 – May 13, 2019) was a Canadian woman who was imprisoned in 1939 in Ontario for being in a relationship with a Chinese immigrant, Harry Yip. She wrote the book Incorrigible in her sixties about her experiences and spent the rest of her life in campaigning for an apology and restitution for all women who had been incarcerated under the Female Refuges Act, the law that imprisoned her for being "incorrigible." It provided a reason that was formulated for police to arrest women who failed to comply with the status quo in Canadian society at the time. In her nineties, she also wrote and self-published a historical fiction book "Nazis in Canada" about the doctor who performed unusual treatments on her and other women in the Andrew Mercer Reformatory for Women.

Demerson won an apology and compensation from the government when she was in her eighties.

== Early life ==
Demerson was born in Saint John, New Brunswick, to a family of Greek ancestry. After her parents divorced, she lived in Toronto in a rooming house on Church Street with her mother, who supported the family by managing the house and reading tea leaves in the parlour under the name "Madam Alice". Her father, on the other hand, remained in Saint John, where he was a successful restaurateur.

At the age of 18, Demerson met Harry Yip in a Yonge Street café, where he worked as a waiter. Eventually gaining his attention, they began dating, and she soon moved in with him. When her father found out that she was involved with a Chinese man, he took a train from Saint John to Toronto to seek the intervention of the Toronto Police.

== Incorrigible ==
Demerson, a white Canadian of European ancestry, was arrested at the home of her fiancé, Harry Yip, by two constables after they had entered the apartment with her father who stated, "That's her." Pregnant with Yip's baby, she was convicted of being "incorrigible" under the Female Refuges Act of 1897.

The Ontario law, which was not repealed until 1964, allowed the government to arrest and institutionalize women between the ages of 16 and 35 for such behaviour as promiscuity, pregnancy out of wedlock, public drunkenness, prostitution, or vagrancy. Demerson was incarcerated at the Mercer Reformatory for Women in Toronto for ten months for consorting with a Chinese man.

While incarcerated she gave birth to her mixed-race son, Harry Jr., who, at three months, was taken away from her until her release. She was subjected to several involuntary medical procedures by a "reformatory" doctor, a leading eugenics practitioner who was searching for evidence of physical deficiencies contributing to the moral defectives of "unmanageable women."

Upon her release from the Mercer Reformatory in 1940, she married Yip, but the marriage ended in divorce three years later. Frustrated that her son was also subject to racial taunting at school, she took him to Hong Kong to avoid bigotry and obtained work teaching English and shorthand to Chinese students. She found herself in financial distress, sent him back to Toronto, and returned herself to live with his father, who was unable to care for him and work and gave him up to foster care.

While Demerson worked as a waitress, she continued to see her son regularly, but he became attached to his foster mother, and the stability her home provided. Her husband, Harry Yip, disappeared. She could not find him to reconcile. She gave up hope of reuniting the family, she fled to Vancouver, joined political groups and became involved in the peace movement and protests during the Vietnam War. Her son became estranged from her, and later died of an asthma attack while he was swimming at the age of 26. That crushed Demerson, who had tried to maintain a relationship with him.

In Vancouver, she remarried and had a daughter and a son. After later separating from her second husband, she continued to raise the two older children as a single parent and worked as a secretary until her retirement.

== Lost Canadian ==
Demerson's marriage with Yip had committed an act, and she soon found stripped her of her Canadian citizenship under the 1946 Canadian Citizenship Act according to which a woman who married a non-Canadian was deemed to have taken their husband's citizenship. However, an application for Chinese citizenship was denied by Chinese embassy officials and she remained officially stateless until 2004.

Under the terms of the Act, a woman who applied to have her citizenship returned would receive it. Demerson applied on 13 November 1948 for which she was finger-printed and given a "Declaration of Intention" to sign. That was an incorrect form signed by at least four persons. She was denied citizenship. Later, she got a birth certificate with her maiden name and acquired citizenship.

== Lawsuit ==
After retiring, Demerson moved back to Toronto in the late 1980s, began searching through government documents and researching her case to come to terms with what had happened to her in her youth, and wrote the book Incorrigible about her experience. She ultimately sought out the paralegal Harry Kopyto, who became interested in her case and conducted legal research into the Female Refuges Act under which she was imprisoned. Kopyto came to the conclusion that as a provincial law, it violated the Constitution of Canada by legislating in criminal law, which is exclusively a federal responsibility.

In 2002, Demerson sued the Ontario government for $11 million for the pain and suffering during her incarceration. The Ontario Superior Court refused to hear the case and cited that the Ontario government is immune to lawsuits stemming from incidents prior to 1964. Later that year, however, she settled out of court and received an apology from the Attorney-General of Ontario and financial compensation in an undisclosed amount from the provincial government.

== Later life ==
Demerson was one of the only inmates of the Andrew Mercer Reformatory for Women who, sixty years after her incarceration at the Reformatory in 1939, received compensation from the Ontario government, at the age of 81. She was never able to find other women who had been at the Mercer Reformatory by researching the inmates from the archives, despite all of the publicity she received.

In 2002, she was awarded the J.S. Woodsworth Prize for anti-racism by the New Democratic Party of Canada. In 2018, Member of Parliament Hedy Fry apologised to her on behalf of the Canadian government for the loss of her citizenship.

She relocated back to Vancouver and later returned to Toronto to research the eugenist doctor and over several more years wrote the book "Nazis in Canada" about that doctor's life and how she was able establish an elitist position as a head doctor in the Mercer Reformatory, with government approval, where she conducted invasive painful treatments on inmates without being scrutinized, and she did her eugenic research.

Demerson returned to British Columbia in 2018, where her adult children lived, at 97, and died in a Vancouver hospital on May 13, 2019, at the age of 98.

In 2020, Demerson was featured in the Canadian documentary film Ketchup and Soya Sauce on how partners in mixed relationships involving first-generation Chinese immigrants and their non-Chinese partner share and navigate their cultural differences.

She was also the subject of a 2022 documentary, Incorrigible - A film about Velma Demerson, based upon her life and experiences.

== Published Works ==
- Demerson, Velma (2004). Incorrigible. Life Writing series. Waterloo, ON: Wilfrid Laurier University Press. ISBN 0-88920-444-6.
- Demerson, Velma (2017). Nazis in Canada, 1919-1939: A Satirical Novel Based on Actual Characters. ISBN 9780995868007. (a satirical work based on her experiences in the reformatory)
