= Vanier Centre for Women =

Canadian prison and treatment facility for women

Coordinates: 43.524727°N 79.899745°W

- Interactive map of Vanier Centre for Women
- Location: 655 Martin Street, Milton, Ontario, Canada
- Status: Operational
- Security class: Medium/Maximum
- Opened: 2003 (current facility)
- Managed by: Ministry of the Solicitor General

The Vanier Centre for Women (French: Centre Vanier pour les femmes) in Milton, Ontario is a medium-sized correctional facility for female offenders serving sentences of less than two years or who have been arrested and are remanded in custody awaiting trial. The institution has capacity for 333 inmates. Services for French-speaking people are offered at this facility.

As it is a maximum-security provincial jail, immigration detainees may be held at the Vanier Centre under the Canadian Border Services Agency.

The Vanier Centre is named after Pauline Vanier, a Canadian humanitarian and the wife of Georges Vanier, a former Governor General of Canada.

== History ==
The original prison, named the Vanier Institute for Women, was a CAD$4,000,000 facility in Brampton, Ontario, that had opened on January 29, 1969. The Brampton location was used to house the Ontario Women's Guidance Centre, the Ontario Women's Treatment Centre, and those from the former Andrew Mercer Reformatory for Women, the latter residents moving into the new prison on April 4, 1969. The Brampton location was a cottage-prison design, which consisted of several 24-room cottages alongside its administration and activities buildings.

The current facility was renamed Vanier Centre for Women and opened in 2003 on the campus of the Maplehurst Correctional Complex.

== Facilities and Services ==
In 2019, the provincial government announced an initiative to create a 5-bed hospital unit for inmates with severe mental illness, and required intensive medical care for the Vanier Centre for Women.

Starting in 2022, the Maplehurst Correctional Complex and the Vanier Centre for Women will receive 15 correctional officers over a 5-year provincial plan to improve correctional facilities. Officers hired completed virtual training at Mohawk College in Hamilton, Ontario.

== Notable incidents ==
In 2005, the Vanier Centre for Women went under investigation after a woman was kept past her original release and denied medication, the latter which caused her to have multiple seizures during her stay. This incident follows shortly of another inmate's death at Vanier, whose incident from officials was described as "peaceful". Acquaintances differ from official reports, who said that the inmate was denied medication or medical attention. Later, a pathology report stated she had unattended seizures prior to her death.

In 2013, a woman began a hunger strike in protest of being placed within solitary confinement when she refused to wear a bra, which Vanier required in its dress code at the time. Vanier altered its dress code after 10 days in confinement, and officially abolished its mandatory bra policy in April 2014.

In 2017, a 50-year-old woman died while at the Vanier Centre for Women after being detained by Canadian immigration officials. An official coroner's report stated that the woman died of "acute methadone intoxication in the setting of ischemic heart disease", caused by Vanier's medical staff giving the woman three times the recommended dose.

=== Sexual abuse ===
In March 2005, a correctional officer was found to give contraband to inmates for sexual favours, and was charged with four counts of breach of trust with three counts of sexual assault.

In March 2021, a correctional officer was charged with two counts of sexual assault and breach of trust at the Vanier Centre for Women. During investigation, officials report that both incidences were conducted on the same day.

== See also ==
- Andrew Mercer Reformatory for Women
- List of provincial correctional facilities in Ontario
