= Chudleigh's Limited =

Canadian food company

Coordinates: 43.53230°N 79.91253°W

- Company type: Private limited company
- Industry: Food industry
- Founded: 1955 in Milton, Ontario, Canada
- Founders: Eric and Marion Chudleigh
- Headquarters: Milton, Ontario, Canada
- Key people: Tom and Carol Chudleigh, Dean and Scott Chudleigh
- Products: Caramel Apple Blossoms, Crumble Crunch Apple Blossoms, Chudleigh's Hard Apple Cider
- Website: chudleighs.com

Chudleigh's Limited is a privately owned Canadian company, based in Milton, Ontario, Canada. Its primary business is frozen baked desserts, which it prepares both for private label customers, and for marketing under its own Chudleigh's brand. Chudleigh's also operates Chudleigh's Farm, an entertainment farm in Milton, Ontario, located on the apple farm where the company was founded.

== History ==
Eric and Marion Chudleigh established a commercial apple orchard in Milton, Ontario, Canada, in 1955, and began propagating an experimental compact apple tree that would make harvesting more efficient. Their son, Tom, took over Chudleigh's Farm in 1963 after completing his BSc (Agr) at the Ontario Agricultural College.

In 1967, Chudleigh's opened its farm to the public during apple season, allowing visitors to pick their own apples. In 1973, Tom's wife Carol began offering visitors slices of homemade apple pie, and by the 1980s, the farm was selling fresh baked whole pies to both farm visitors and restaurants in nearby Toronto.

In 1990, a fire destroyed most of the Chudleigh's Farm facility, leaving only the family home. In the aftermath and rebuilding, the commercial bakery was relocated to a separate facility nearby. Since then, it has remained in dedicated facilities as it has grown, occupying its current 120,000 sq. ft. Milton location in 2007. The Chudleigh's Farm continues to operate as a popular destination for families, as well as an event space between July 1 - October 31 every year. The farm activities include pick-your-own apples, a hay maze, farm animals, various swings, slides and play areas, as well as a retail and restaurant area.

Tom and Carol's sons Dean and Scott both joined the business (in 1986 and 1990 respectively), and have led the growth of the commercial bakery. Today, all four Chudleighs, along with other family members, actively manage the bakery and farm operations of Chudleigh's Limited.

The bakery products are sold in major Canadian grocery store chains, supermarkets and restaurants in North America, Europe, Mexico, Japan and Australia.

In summer 2018, Chudleigh's added Summer Cider Nights, featuring live local music and serving the new hard apple cider, to their pick-your-own apples family entertainment lineup.

== Products ==
- Crumble Crunch Apple Blossoms
- Caramel Apple Blossoms
- Apple Berry Blossoms
- Pineapple Upside Down Cake
- Molten Chocolate Lava Cakes
- Butter Toffee Sticky Cakes
- Mac N Cheese Blossoms
- Chudleigh's Orchard Cider

In 2017, Brick Brewing Company partnered with Chudleigh's to produce a Chudleigh's branded hard apple cider beginning with the 2018 summer season.
