= Hawthorne Village =

Suburban community in Milton, Ontario, Canada

Hawthorne Village is a suburban community in Milton, Ontario. It was established by Mattamy Homes in 1999. Hawthorne Village has 3500 families. In 2002 Hawthorne Village was awarded "Project of the Year" by the Ontario Home Builders Association and "Community of the Year" by the Greater Toronto Homebuilders Association.

== History ==
The previous subdivision developments in the urban area were registered in 1974. In 1999 a 15.5 km water main from the Upper Middle Road Reservoir, and sewage lines to Oakville, Ontario treatment facilities were installed in the area.

In 2001 about 1,600 building permits were issued. The 2007 Sherwood survey is approved for the southwest side of town with provision for 12,000 more homes (35,000 residents). A third phase, known as the Boyne Survey, was expected to be developed in about 15 years.

== Construction ==
Besides conventional on-site construction, Mattamy Homes used prefabrication for many of the houses in Hawthorne Village.

Unlike other prefab builders, which build the house in sections and then ship the sections to the site for assembly, these houses are shipped with cabinetry, light fixtures, electrical and plumbing systems installed. Mattamy utilizes a private road between their factory and the housing site. While indoor construction is more expensive than building on-site, Mattamy's prefab process completes in 70 less days than on-site construction, avoiding weather uncertainties and providing a safer and proeductive environment.

The Stelumar Advanced Manufacturing plant can produce a house in eleven days, and work on ten homes at once. Every day, the production line shifts each house to the next work station. The Stelumar facility is expected to operate for four years, producing 220 homes a year, after which Mattamy will disassemble and remove the plant.
