= Female Refuges Act =

Ontario, Canada statute

Legislative Assembly of Ontario
- Long title: An Act respecting Industrial Refuges for Females
- Enacted by: Legislative Assembly of Ontario
- Passed: 1913
- Royal assent: May 6, 1913

Repeals
- March 25, 1964

Amended by
- 1919 (S.O. c.84); 1927 (S.O. c.28); 1932 (S.O. c.53); 1937 (S.O. c.72); 1939 (S.O. c.47); 1942 (S.O. c.34); 1948 (S.O. c.30); 1958 (S.O. c.28)

Related legislation
- An Act to repeal The Female Refuges Act
- Status: Repealed

The Female Refuges Act was an act passed by the Ontario Legislature. The Act granted judges the power to order the incarceration of women in Ontario for various reasons such as public intoxication, and morals crimes. It also granted judges the power to order the placement of girls who were deemed uncontrollable or 'incorrigible' into reform facilities. In these "industrial refuges", the inmates (if able) were expected to work, the proceeds of which were used to support the institution.

The first Act governing houses of refuge, An Act respecting Houses of Refuge for Females was passed in 1893. It was replaced by the Female Refuges Act in 1913. The 1913 act added several other terms for commitment to a house of refuge. The 1919 amendment added provisions for commitment for "drunkards", those begging, and for parents to commit their "incorrigible" daughters.

== Terms and conditions for committal ==
Under the original 1893 act:

- A judge could order any woman convicted of a crime to be committed to a refuge instead of a prison or local jail.
- An inmate of a training school for girls could be committed to a refuge to complete the rest of their term.

The 1913 act incorporated the 1893 version terms and amended this to limit the age of inmates covered by the act to thirty-five and under.

The 1919 act added:

- Any person could bring forth a woman under the age of thirty-five to a judge if they have been found begging in a public place
- Any person could bring forth a woman under the age of thirty-five to a judge, "is an habitual drunkard or by reason of other vices is leading an idle and dissolute life."
- Any parent or guardian could bring forth a woman under the age of twenty-one "who proves un-manageable or incorrigible"

A judge or magistrate could send the woman to a refuge for a period of no more than five years, which was later reduced to two years in the 1919 version of the act.

=== Amendments ===
Subsequent amendments referred to matters of administration, such as municipal regulations. The 1939 amendment changed the terms of transfer from an industrial refuge from those "unmanageable or incorrigible" to any inmate to a "common gaol" or the Mercer Reformatory. In 1942, women sentenced to a training school could now be ordered to serve out their sentence at a refuge. The 1942 amendment also added the provision that orders under the act could now be appealed at the Ontario Court of Appeal. In 1958, the administration of orders under the act became the responsibility of the Deputy Minister of Reform Institutions.

=== House of Refuge or Industrial Refuge ===
An "industrial refuge" was simply an institution designated by the Lieutenant-Governor in Council as a place to which females could be committed. One prominent institution was the Andrew Mercer Reformatory for Women in Toronto, which had as one department the Industrial Refuge for Girls. Another was Belmont House in Toronto, which opened in 1853 and closed in 1939. Roman Catholic women were sent to the "Good Shepherd" in Sudbury, and juveniles were sent to the Galt reform school.

== Repeal ==
In the years leading up to 1964, increasing scrutiny was given to the primary facility, the Mercer Reformatory. In 1964, the Government of Ontario decided to repeal the act, passing An Act to repeal The Female Refuges Act. It also convened a grand jury to examine the Mercer Reformatory. They found deplorable conditions and recommended several reforms. The Mercer Reformatory was closed in 1969, five years later.

One woman, Velma Demerson, was incarcerated in 1939 because she was unmarried and living with a Chinese man. She was deemed incorrigible and placed in Mercer. Although pregnant, she was institutionalized for a period of ten months. She would later sue the Ontario government and receive an out-of-court settlement and an apology.
