= Campbellville Intermediate Baseball Team =

- Founded in 1952; Campbellville, Ontario

Minor league affiliations
- Class: None
- Previous classes: Intermediate C (1952-55); Intermediate A (1956-59); Intermediate B (1960); Intermediate A (1961); Intermediate B (1962-63); Intermediate C (1964-66); Intermediate B (1967-68)
- Previous leagues: Ontario Baseball Association

Major league affiliations
- Team: None

Team data
- Name: Milton Merchants
- Ballpark: Campbellville Ball Park (Old)
- General manager: Len Andrews
- Manager: Len Andrews

The Campbellville Intermediate Baseball Team was one of the top amateur baseball teams in Canada in the 1950s and 1960s. For 16 years, the team dominated the senior baseball circuit in Ontario.

== Background ==
Baseball has a long history in Milton, particularly in Campbellville, Ontario where it had its beginnings with the Lumberman's Baseball Club as early as 1872. It really flourished as a community tradition in the 1920s and 1930s, but was interrupted with the outbreak of World War II.

In 1950, a team of local boys formed a juvenile team that competed in the Halton County League in the 1950 and 1951 seasons. As several boys were about to go over juvenile age for the 1952 season, and on account of half a dozen local players already playing in the Intermediate League for Milton or Waterdown, it was decided to enter Campbellville into this top competition.

In the 1950s and 60s, the Campbellville Intermediate Baseball Team won numerous county and provincial titles in a 16-year span from 1952 to 1968. A grandstand and club house was erected in 1960 in Campbellville to make room for the 2,000 spectators that would descend on the hamlet. In 1953, the Campbellville Baseball Club won the OBA Intermediate C Championship in just its second year in the league, before repeating again and again.

Managed by Len Andrews, and known as the Merchants, the men's Campbellville baseball team won 11 consecutive Halton county league titles, as well as 12 Ontario Championship titles between 1952-1967, an amazing feat for a hamlet of 300 at the time.

== Notable records ==
During this 16-year era, the team had a winning percentage of .771 and picked up championship titles all over Ontario.

During the same period in the Ontario Baseball Association playoffs, the team won 85 of 108 games (.787 winning percentage).

Within the years of 1959-64, the team's peak, Campbellville went 175-36-5 (.829 winning percentage).

Jim Vipond, sports editor of the national newspaper the Globe and Mail, wrote in one of his columns: "Hats off to Campbellville's championship baseball teams."

When the club repeated as Ontario Intermediate C champions in 1954, it marked the first time this had been accomplished since the creation of the "C" classification in 1934.

== Manager ==
Len Andrews served as a lieutenant in the Canadian Army overseas during the Second World War with the 22nd Canadian Regiment (Canadian Grenadier Guards).

He received several awards for his amateur baseball work including from the Premier of Ontario and the Ontario Baseball Association of which he was past president and a life member.

== Notable alumni ==
- Stan Henderson, .369 average over 450 games
- Jack Roberts, pitcher with record of 180-46 in 16 years (.796 winning percentage) and an ERA of 1.89. In the 1966 final, he pitched two consecutive no hitters and did not walk a batter in 18 consecutive innings. Roberts was inducted into the Milton Sports Hall of Fame in 2022.
- Al Wingrove, .382 average over 417 games

== Legacy ==
As a result of the strong baseball traditions established by the intermediate team, other Campbellville baseball teams won four more provincial titles between 1968 and 1984.

The Old Campbellville Baseball Park remains one of Canada's oldest baseball parks. It was significantly reworked prior to the 1953 season.

The team is considered one of the greatest amateur sports teams in the history of Ontario.

== Ontario Championships ==
- Ontario Intermediate A Champions - 1956
- Ontario Intermediate A "Major" Champions - 1958, 1961
- Ontario Intermediate B Champions - 1960, 1962, 1967, 1973
- Ontario Intermediate C Champions - 1953, 1954, 1955, 1964, 1965, 1966

== Honours ==
In 2008, numerous efforts were undertaken to have the team recognized by the Canadian Baseball Hall of Fame, including by NHL referee Bruce Hood. To date, those efforts have been unsuccessful.

However, the intermediate men's squad (1952-67 era) was inducted into the Baseball Ontario Hall of Fame in 2014.

In 2016, the Milton Sports Hall of Fame inducted the Campbellville Intermediate Baseball Team inducted as its first ever honoured team.
