= Mattamy Homes =

Canadian residential building company

Mattamy Homes Corporation
- Trade name: Mattamy Homes
- Type: Private
- Industry: Home-building
- Founder: Peter E. Gilgan
- Website: mattamyhomes.com

Mattamy Homes is a Canadian residential housing builder, founded in Toronto by Peter Gilgan in 1978. The largest family-owned homebuilder in North America, Mattamy Homes is Canada's largest residential home builder and top-25 builder in the United States.

The company's name is a portmanteau of the names of Gilgan's two oldest children, Matt and Amy.

== History ==
Mattamy Homes started constructing homes in 1978, having built a home in Burlington, Ontario as their first project. Shortly after, Mattamy Homes made its first multi-lot purchase of 20 lots in Burlington, Ontario and kickstarts their growth as a home developer.

In 1985 Mattamy Homes introduced their Glen Abbey community, the first multi-phased community ever built by Mattamy.

In the 1990s, Mattamy introduced the WideLot™ concept, resulting in a wider and more welcoming street profile. The first WideLot™ homes were built in The Orchard community in Burlington, Ontario. These types of homes can be widely seen across the GTA, notably in the Springdale community in Brampton, Ontario.

In 2003, in an effort to continuing their orderly expansion, Mattamy expands to the United States.

In 2004, Mattamy introduces factory-built homes.

In 2015, Mattamy completed an acquisition of a high-rise development firm, Monarch Corporation, and enters the high-rise market.

In 2022, Mattamy closed their first ever GeoExchange community heated and cooled by Geothermal energy technology. As a result of this, Mattamy was qualified as a Net-Zero Builder under the Canadian Home Builders' Association. This community was the first of its kind in the GTA located in the Phase 1 development, Springwater in Berczy Village, Markham, Ontario.

== Markets ==
Most of Mattamy Homes' projects have been in the Greater Toronto Area and Ottawa, but has also built homes in Calgary, Edmonton, Waterloo Region and numerous markets in the United States including Florida, Arizona, Texas and the Carolinas.

Notable neighbourhoods and communities developed by Mattamy Homes include:

- Hawthorne Village, Milton, Ontario
- Mattamy on Main, Whitchurch-Stouffville, Ontario
- Springwater in Berczy Village, Markham, Ontario
- Parkside Towns at Saturday in Downsview Park, North York, Toronto, Ontario
- Wellen Park, North Port, Florida

== Philanthropy ==
In 2011, Peter Gilgan donated $15 million to Ryerson University. The money was used to create the Mattamy Athletic Centre on the upper level of Maple Leaf Gardens.

In 2013, Gilgan donated $40 million to the development of The Hospital for Sick Children Centre for Research and Learning.

In 2015, Gilgan donated $5-million to Parks Foundation Calgary to be used for the development of a 138-kilometre ring of paved pathways around the city. The creation of the Rotary/Mattamy Greenway began in 2010 and was completed in 2017.

In North Port, Florida, Mattamy donated 90 acres (36 ha) of land along with $4.7 million towards the development of the new CoolToday Park, a ballpark and spring training complex for the Atlanta Braves which opened March 24, 2019 against the Tampa Bay Rays.

In 2019, Gilgan donated $100 million to The Hospital for Sick Children in Toronto, making Gilgan the largest health care benefactor in Canada at the time.

In 2022, Gilgan donated $105 million to Trillium Health Partners to build the "Peter Gilgan Mississauga Hospital" and to expand the existing Queensway Health Centre. The donation was the largest donation to a hospital in Canadian history.

== Controversies ==
Prior to the 2018 Ontario general election, Mattamy Homes donated $100,000 to Ontario Proud, a right-wing political advocacy group which used television ads and Facebook to support Doug Ford and the Progressive Conservative Party of Ontario. Of the $460,000 raised by Ontario Proud, most was donated by developers "who wanted Ford to ease environmental rules for housing developments". The donation, controversial due to Ontario's recent prohibition of political donations to candidates from corporations, was the subject of broad media coverage, including in the CBC, Global News, and the Globe and Mail, and the legitimacy of the donation was questioned by the Canadian Medical Association Journal. Mattamy was forced to release a public statement addressing the donation, and pledged to make no contributions to political advocacy groups in the future.

In 2019, Mattamy was fined $25,000 by the city of Guelph for 78 charges of illegal tree cutting on a lot in the south end of the city.

== See also ==
- Maple Leaf Gardens
- Mattamy National Cycling Centre
