= CoolToday Park =

Ballpark in North Port, Florida, US

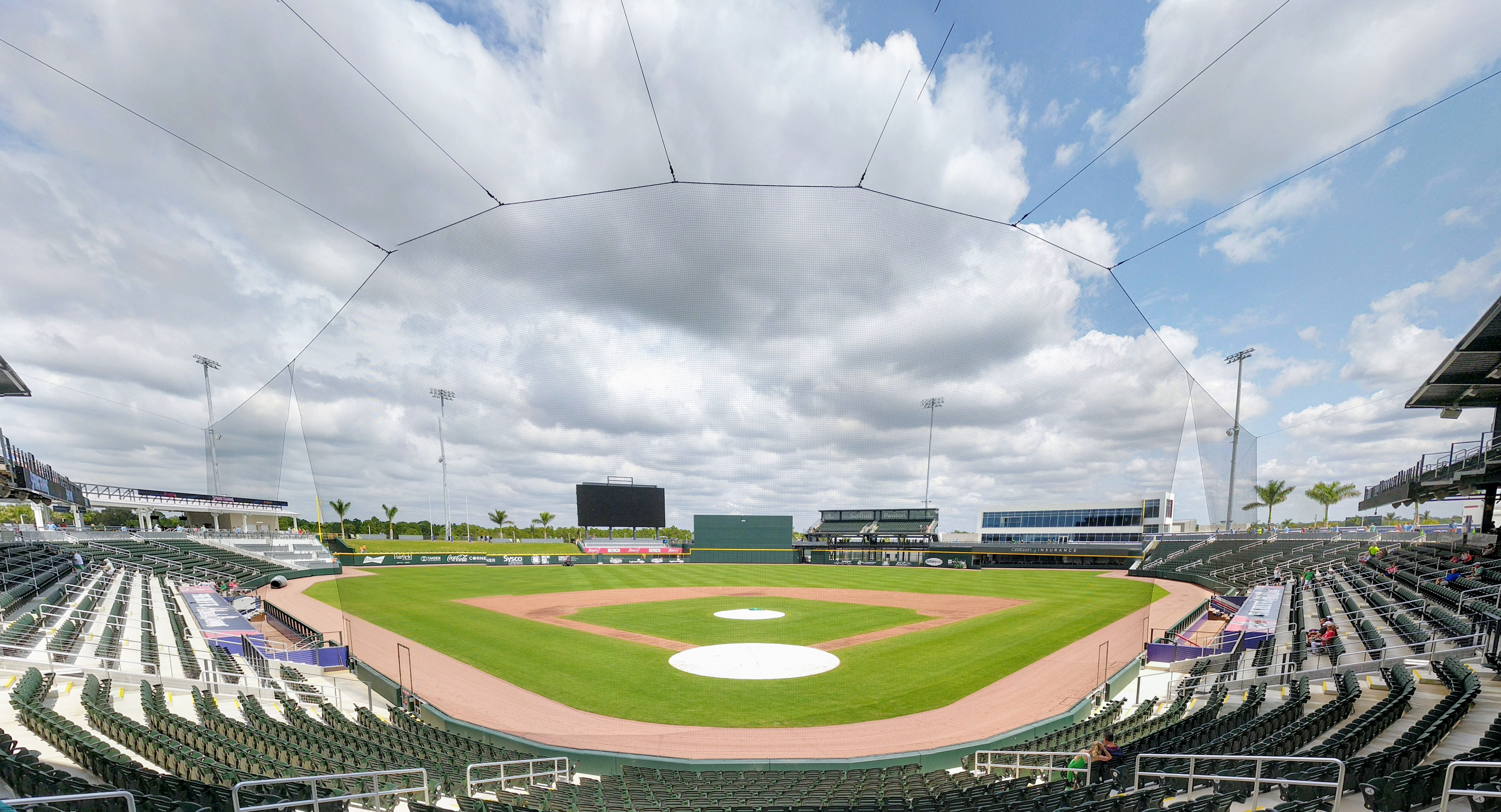

- Location within Florida Location within the United States
- Interactive map of CoolToday Park
- Address: 18800 South West Villages Parkway
- Location: North Port, Florida
- Coordinates: 27°02′01″N 82°19′12″W
- Owner: Sarasota County
- Operator: Atlanta Braves
- Capacity: 6,200 fixed seats and 7,473 spectators total
- Type: Stadium
- Surface: Grass
- Field size: Left Field – 335 ft (102 m); Left-Center – 385 ft (117 m); Center Field – 400 ft (120 m); Right-Center – 375 ft (114 m); Right Field – 325 ft (99 m)
- Acreage: 70
- Public transit: Breeze Transit

Construction
- Groundbreaking: October 16, 2017
- Opened: March 24, 2019
- Cost: $140 million
- Architects: Fawley Bryant Architecture & Pendulum
- Project manager: Carolyn Eastwood
- General contractor: Tandem Construction

Tenants
- Atlanta Braves (MLB) 2019–present FCL Braves (FCL) (2019–present)

CoolToday Park is a ballpark in North Port, Florida, located south of Sarasota, Florida. It is the spring training home of the Atlanta Braves of Major League Baseball. CoolToday Park has 6,200 permanent seats and a capacity of 7,473 with berm and standing-room areas. The complex also includes the Braves' clubhouse, player development and training facilities, practice fields, and sports medicine facilities, while the ballpark's outfield dimensions mirror those of Truist Park, the Braves' home stadium.

Private and public sources funded the Braves' $140 million project. Sarasota County contributed through hotel bed tax dollars. The city of North Port contributed $4.7 million, and West Villages (now Wellen Park), the planned community within North Port that houses the facility, ran the construction and development. The Braves committed to a 30-year lease. The ballpark opened on March 24, 2019, with the Braves' 4–2 win over the Tampa Bay Rays.

== Funding ==
=== Planning ===
In 2015, the Atlanta Braves began looking for a new Spring Training home. From 1998 to 2019, the Braves held spring training at Champion Stadium near Orlando. To reduce travel times the team sought a new spring home in Florida to get closer to other teams' facilities.

In March 2016, Sarasota County officials voted to enter formal negotiations with the Braves. The Braves and Sarasota County began discussing a 100-to-150-acre (40 to 61 ha) site in the Wellen Park master-planned community in North Port.

In January 2017, the Atlanta Braves and Sarasota County announced that formal negotiations had begun regarding a new spring training facility. About six weeks after Sarasota County entered exclusive negotiations with the team, the two sides reached agreement on the primary terms of a proposed deal. The initial term sheet outlined plans for a $75.4 million, 70 acres (28 ha) facility to be constructed in North Port, with funding coming from Sarasota County, the state of Florida, the city of North Port, the Braves organization, and a private developer. Mattamy Homes, a private developer, donated the land and $4.7 million. By March 2018, the projected cost of the facility had grown to $125 million.

=== City and county approval ===
Between February and September 2017, multiple governmental approvals finalized the financing and development framework for the Braves' new spring training complex. The Sarasota County Commission approved an initial term sheet outlining project responsibilities in a 4–1 vote on February 28, 2017, followed by a May 9 decision to allocate a portion of the county’s tourist development tax toward the project, including repayment of approximately $22 million in borrowing without a tax increase. On May 23, the county unanimously approved a 30-year operating and non-relocation agreement with the Braves, setting a target construction completion date of January 15, 2019.

In June 2017, Wellen Park sought $20 million in state grant funding as part of the project's public–private financing plan, while North Port approved a public use licensing agreement for the facility. The state of Florida put in $20 million after showing the Braves' arrival would add $1.7 billion economic impact on the area over the team's 30-year lease. The North Port City Commission later approved $4.7 million in local funding on July 25, 2017, followed by conditional approval of $20 million in state funding on September 1, 2017. Sarasota County commissioners unanimously approved the final agreements on September 12, 2017, including an interlocal agreement assigning design and construction duties to the West Villages Improvement District, with ownership transferring to the county upon completion. Final public approval was granted by the North Port City Commission on September 19, 2017.

== Construction ==
By September 2017, preliminary site work, including studies and surveying, was underway at the future stadium location. On September 1, 2017, the Braves named Mike Dunn as Vice President of Florida Operations. Dunn was placed in charge of development for the new spring training complex, and on October 16, 2017, team officials and local leaders held a formal groundbreaking for the planned $100 million facility. During the brief ceremony, Braves Vice Chairman John Schuerholz addressed more than 100 attendees, including fans, residents, and elected officials, welcoming them as new partners in the project.

Sarasota-based Tandem Construction and Michigan-based Barton Malow were in charge of the project. The construction schedule was to complete the stadium in time for when pitchers and catchers report to camp in February 2019. However, on January 31, 2018, the Braves announced they would extend their lease with Disney's ESPN Wide World of Sports through April 2019 "to ensure there is enough time to complete" the new facility. The team held their 2019 spring training at Disney and played their final spring training home game at the new facility.

In June 2018, renderings of the new park were released. On December 4, 2018, North Port announced a 20-year stadium naming-rights deal with CoolToday, a local air conditioning, heating, plumbing and electrical services company, in which the park's name was unveiled: CoolToday Park. At the completion of the park, the costs for the project increased to $140 million.

== Design ==
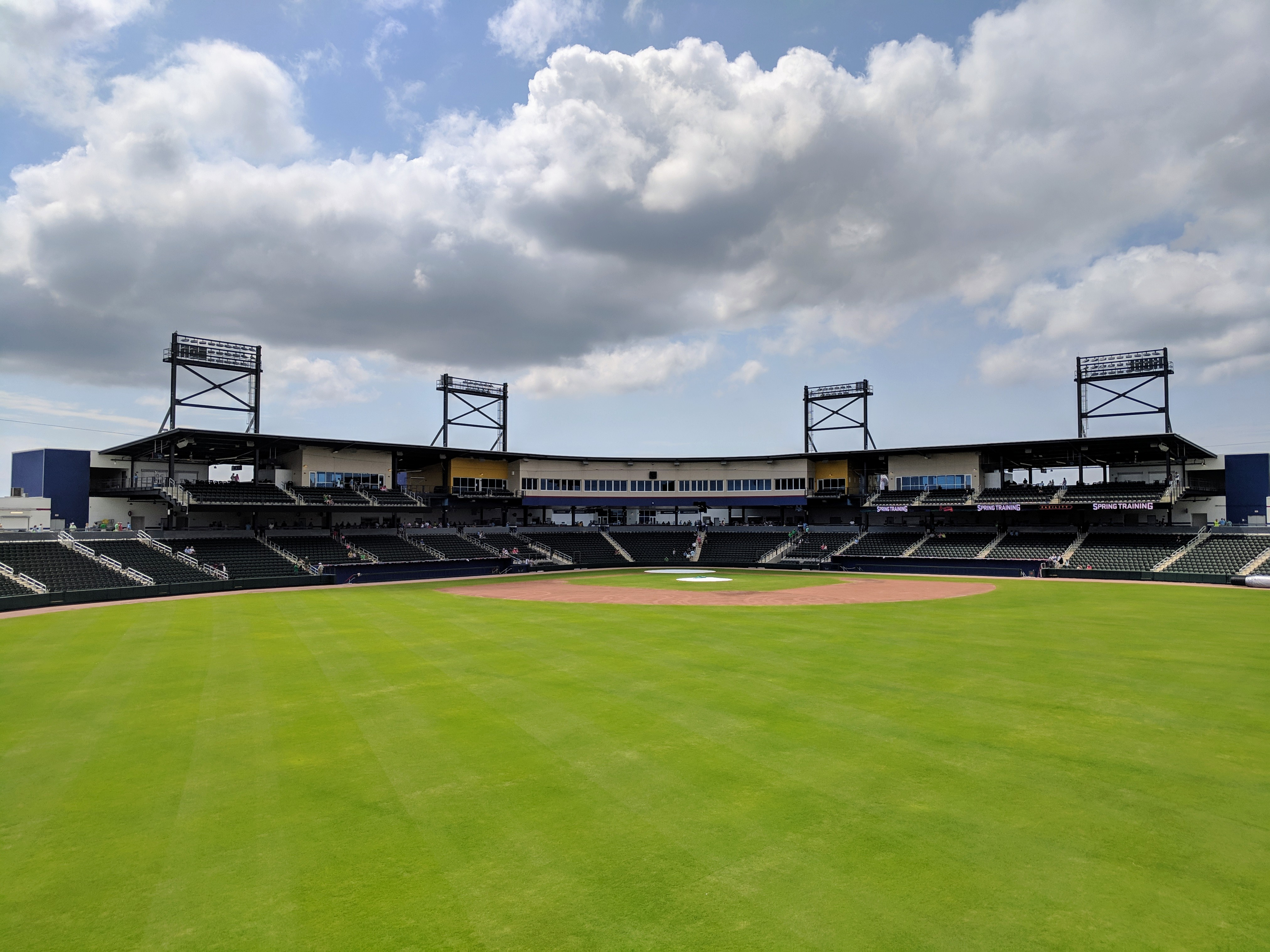
CoolToday Park from center field

CoolToday Park includes 6,200 permanent seats and can hold 7,473 spectators when berm and standing room areas are used. The complex also contains the team clubhouse, player development and training facilities, six practice baseball fields, six multi-use fields, and space dedicated to the organization's sports medicine academy. The broader development is intended to serve as the centerpiece of a planned mixed-use town center district, creating potential partnerships between the team, a nearby college, and surrounding medical offices.

The main stadium is located on the northern portion of the property, immediately south of a proposed elementary and middle school campus. A public plaza along West Villages Parkway is designed to function as an event space when baseball activities are not taking place. Practice and multi-use fields occupy the southern and eastern areas of the approximately 70 to 75 acres (28 to 30 ha) site. The multi-use fields are used for overflow parking during spring training and serve as public recreation space for local schools and tournaments. The team's sports medicine, fitness, and physical therapy facilities are also located within the complex.

The ballpark incorporates several familiar facets from other Grapefruit League facilities. The clubhouse behind the right field fence is reminiscent of Charlotte Sports Park. An outfield grandstand is similar to Bradenton's LECOM Park. The berm in left field is common to many spring training facilities. The ballpark has a left-field tiki bar, as does the Phillies' Spectrum Field in Clearwater.

The outfield dimensions mirror those of Truist Park, the Braves' home stadium.

== Opening ==
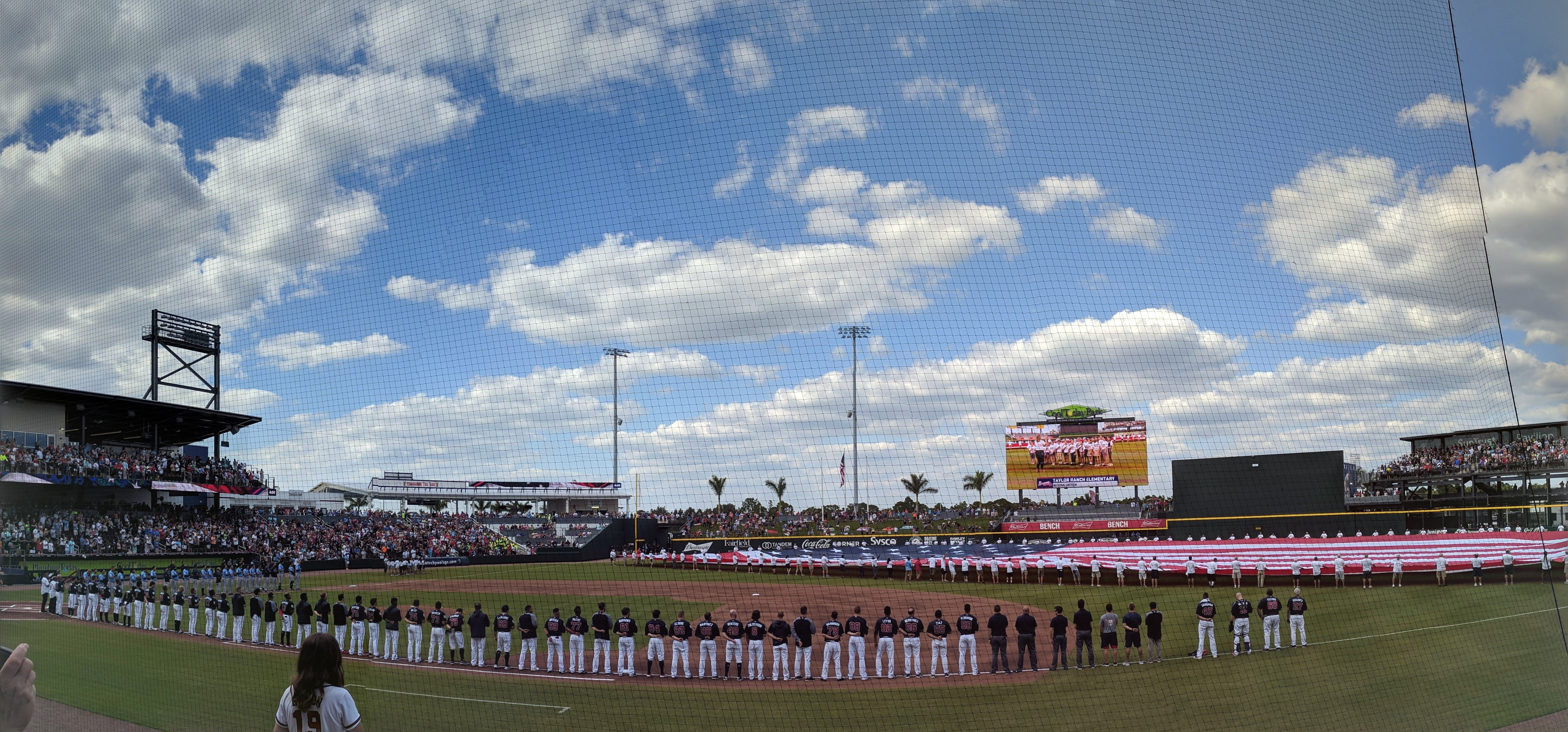
Opening game at CoolToday Park

The park was not complete before the 2019 season, however, on March 24, 2019, the Braves held the first game at the park at the end of the Spring Training season. Many former Braves players were in attendance, including Hank Aaron. After a pregame ribbon-cutting and a ceremonial first pitch by former Braves player Terry Pendleton, former Braves manager Bobby Cox proclaimed "play ball!" Kevin Gausman threw the first pitch and the Braves won 4–2 over the Tampa Bay Rays.

== History ==
=== COVID-19 pandemic ===
The COVID-19 pandemic interrupted the park's first full spring training season in March 2020, when Major League Baseball suspended spring training. When spring training resumed in 2021, the Braves limited attendance to approximately 1,800 spectators per game and implemented physical distancing measures. Public access to team workouts was also restricted.

=== Hurricane Ian ===
In September 2022, the park and complex sustained extensive damage from Hurricane Ian, with repairs estimated to cost approximately $10 million. The storm damaged the complex's roofs, fencing, and landscaping, while flooding affected the clubhouse, press box, and areas beneath the stadium. High winds also displaced infield clay from the complex's baseball fields, requiring the replacement of more than 150 tons of clay.

The damage forced the cancellation of events scheduled for October 2022. Following several months of repairs, CoolToday Park reopened for the Braves' 2023 spring training home opener against the Boston Red Sox on February 25, 2023.
