= Wellen Park, Florida =

Wellen Park
- Planned community
- Etymology: German: wellen, lit. 'waves'; Dutch: wellen, lit. 'wellness'
- Location within Florida
- Coordinates: 27°02′59″N 82°19′16″W
- Country: United States
- State: Florida
- County: Sarasota
- City: North Port
- Elevation: 6.6 ft (2 m)
- Time zone: UTC−05:00 (EST)
  - Summer (DST): UTC−04:00 (EDT)
- ZIP code(s): 34223, 34293
- Area code: 941
- Website: wellenpark.com

Wellen Park (formerly known as the West Villages) is a planned community located in Sarasota County, Florida, United States. The majority of Wellen Park is located along US 41 and River Road within the city limits of North Port, with some portions of the community extending into unincorporated Sarasota County.

== History ==
The land was part of unincorporated Sarasota County and used for ranching and agriculture in the 1930s, becoming known as Taylor Ranch. The property was sold in 2002 and became Thomas Ranch. In 2002, approximately 8,000 acres (3,200 ha) of Thomas Ranch was annexed by the city of North Port, as per a request from the landowners at the time. Following this annexation, the land was sold to developers, who planned on creating a large-scale master-planned community similar to other communities in Florida such as The Villages, Lakewood Ranch and Babcock Ranch. The developers broke ground in the mid-2000s amid a housing boom, however the Great Recession halted further development until the mid-2010s.

In May 2014, a partnership, including Mattamy Homes and Vanguard Land and other developers, invested about $100 million to purchase approximately 9,600 acres (3,900 ha) that represented the remainder of the former Berry and Taylor family ranch, rebranding the community as the West Villages. The community was to include several new neighborhoods, and a shopping center. Over the next 6 years, construction boomed with the addition of multiple new neighborhoods, a shopping center, and infrastructure.

In April 2020, the master-planned community was renamed Wellen Park. The new name is meant to serve as a cohesive branding for communities to be built in the future, as over 7,000 acres (2,800 ha) of land is still undeveloped. The community will be geographically organized into Districts, with current districts including the West Villages, Downtown Wellen, and Playmore.

== Neighborhoods ==
Wellen Park includes the following neighborhoods:

- Grand Palm
- Gran Paradiso
- IslandWalk
- Oasis
- The Preserve
- Renaissance
- Sarasota National
- Tortuga
- Antigua
- Avelina
- Gran Place
- Wellen Park Golf & Country Club
- Solstice
- Sunstone
- Wysteria
- EVERLY
- Lakespur
- Brightmore

== CoolToday Park ==
In early 2017, the Atlanta Braves professional baseball team announced the selection of North Port, Florida, as the site of CoolToday Park. Sarasota County has approved its funding earmarking about $22 million in tourist development taxes. The city of North Port will provide $4.7 million and the Florida Sports Foundation is slated to contribute $20 million.

The developer donated the land. The Atlanta Braves are making the upfront capital contribution and annual lease payments. By hosting the stadium, Wellen Park intends future activities, events and opportunities for its residents as well as visitors from throughout the region and the country.

== West Villages Improvement District ==
Much of the planned community is situated within the West Villages Improvement District (WVID), a specialized taxing district whose purpose is to provide infrastructure, including community development systems, facilities, services, projects, and improvements to the District.

The District was established by Florida Legislature on June 17, 2004. A five-person board governs the District, which oversees approximately 11,000 acres (4,500 ha).
