= Jan Zalasiewicz =

British-Polish geologist

Jan Zalasiewicz (down right) in 2023

Jan Zalasiewicz (born 1954 in Manchester) is a British-Polish geologist and palaeontologist, emeritus professor at the University of Leicester, and Ig Nobel laureate.

== Life ==
His parents escaped from Siberia with the Anders' Army. He was the head of the Anthropocene Working Group from 2009 to 2020. In 2014, a paper co-authored by Zalasiewicz coined the term technofossil.

== Publications ==
- The Earth After Us (2008), ISBN 9780199214976.
- The Planet in a Pebble: A Journey Into Earth's Deep History (2012)
- The Cosmic Oasis: The Remarkable Story of Earth's Biosphere (2022), with Mark Williams ISBN 9780198845874
