= Technomass =

Mass of all human created objects on Earth

Technomass refers to the mass of all human-made (artificial/anthropogenic) structures and objects on Earth. The amount of technomass provides a quantitative characterization of the human impact on the planet. The term gained prominence when a study. showed that, around 2020, the amount of all technomass became greater than the global biomass, i.e. the mass of all of living organisms on the planet. Having crossed this symbolic level highlights the dramatic human-induced epoch of the Anthropocene. It has also been pointed out the production of technomass is on a scale greater than natural erosive terrestrial geological processes. In 2024, the total technomass is estimated to be about 1.4 teratons (1.4 trillion tons)

== Main contributions ==
Technomass is dominated by construction materials in structures (e.g. buildings) and infrastructure (e.g. pavements). Its main contributions are

- concrete: ~50%
- construction aggregates (crushed stone, gravel, sand): ~30%
- bricks: ~8%
- asphalt: ~5%
- metal structures: ~3%
- glass: a few %

In addition, manufactured plastics contribute to about 1%. Their production keeps increasing exponentially. Today, humans use about 100 times their own mass in plastic.

Maps of technomass can now be created using satellite-based observations of the Earth.

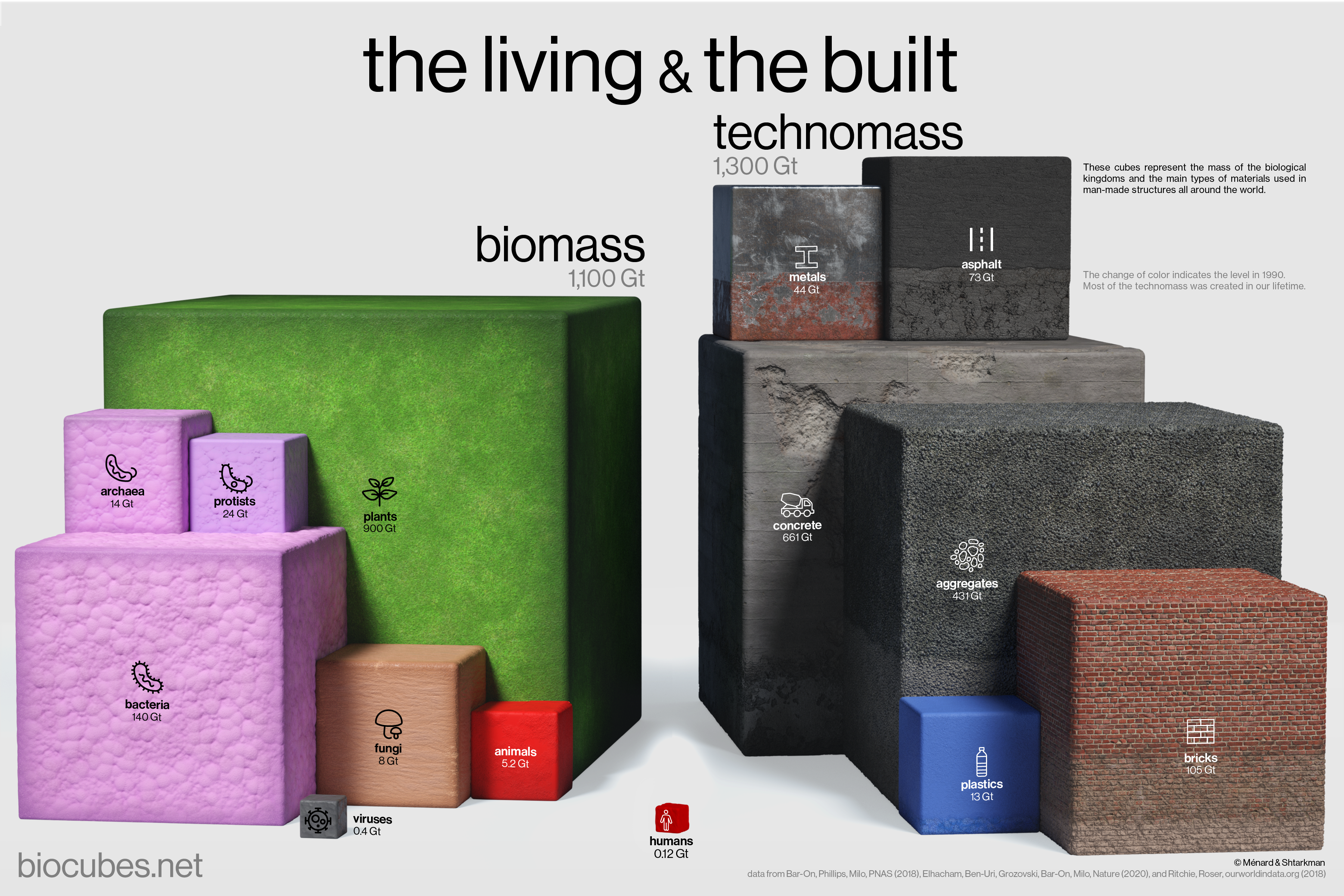
Inventory of biomass and technomass around 2024. Credits: biocubes.net

== The 20th century rise of the technomass ==
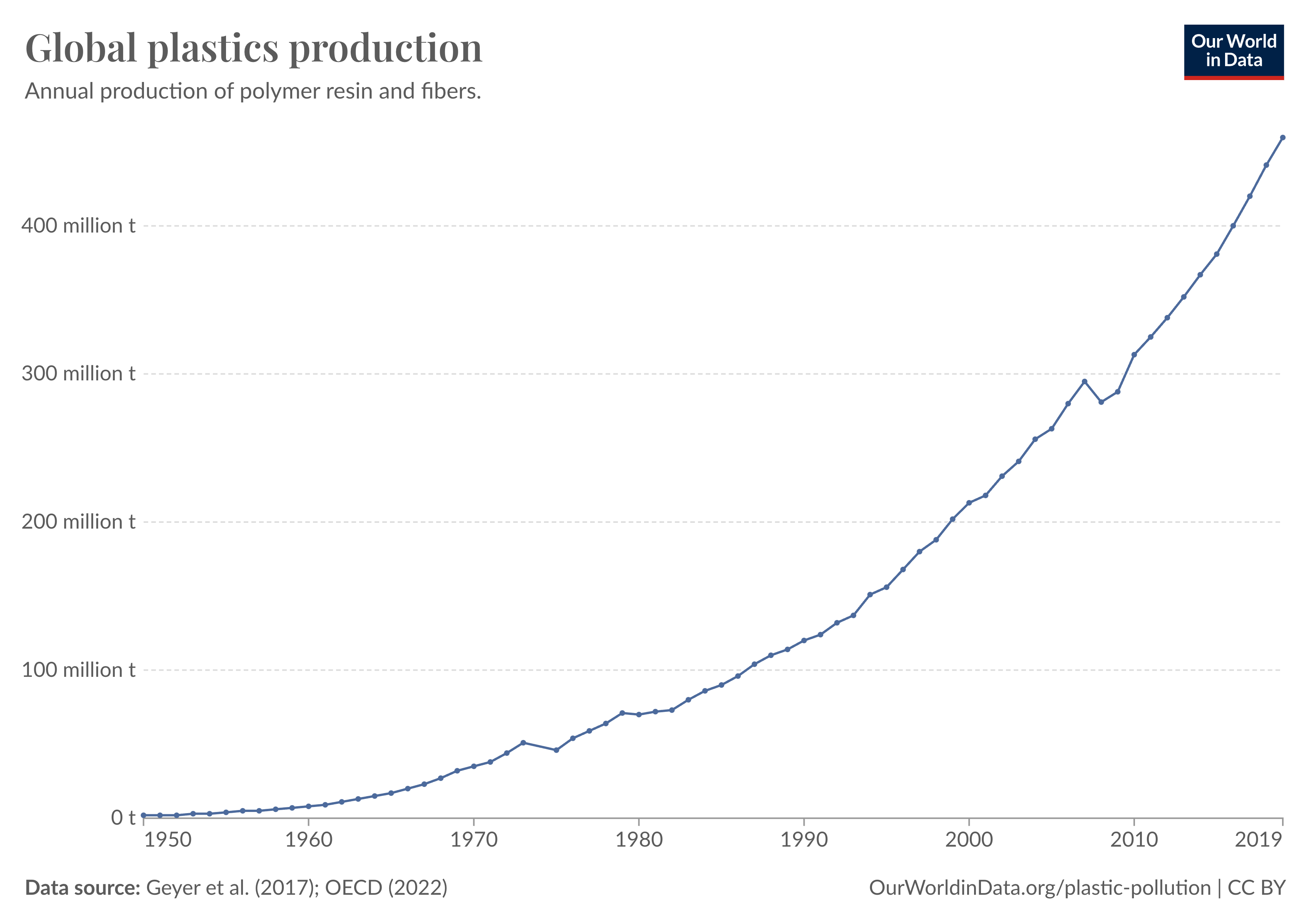
The rapid increase of global plastics production

The concept of technomass is important in discussions about human impact on the environment, resource consumption, and the Anthropocene—the proposed geological epoch defined by significant human influence on Earth's geology and ecosystems. It was estimated that, in 2020, the total technomass was around 1.1 teratons (1,100 gigatons), most of which created over the past century. In comparison, the 1.1 teratons of biomass emerged over several billion years.

Since the beginning of the 20th century, technomass has doubled roughly every 20 years. It is a key indicator of human influence on the planet and its measurement helps track resource use and environmental impact. Today, the transformation of the Earth's land surface by mineral extraction and construction is on a scale greater than natural erosive terrestrial geological processes. Humans have become the most significant global geomorphological driving force. Each week, they produce an amount of technomass that is comparable to that of their own mass.

== See also ==
- Anthropocene
- Technofossil
