= Lake Pohjalampi =

Lake in Finland

- Location within Finland
- Location: Eastern Finland
- Coordinates: 62°40′N 29°33′E
- Basin countries: Finland
- Surface area: 61 ha (150 acres)
- Average depth: 3.2 m (10 ft)
- Max. depth: 5.3 m (17 ft)

Lake Pohjalampi is a lake in eastern Finland. The lake has a surface area of 61 hectares, and the mean and maximum depth are 3.2 meters and 5.3 meters, respectively.

== Ecological Experiment ==
The lake was used to study the effects of biomanipulation on a small, mesotrophic lake. From 1993 to 1997, over 200 kilograms per hectare of fish, mainly roach (Rutilus rutilus) and bream (Abramis brama) were caught and removed. This resulted in a reduction of nearly 80% of fish biomass. The effects on the benthic invertebrates were investigated using biomass and density, during the years of fish removal and for the following three years. The decrease in benthivorous fish stock led to higher biomass and density in all the major benthic invertebrate groups.

Three years after fish removal had been discontinued, the fish biomass had recovered to almost its initial value; the community structure, however, was different because of much greater abundance of perch. The biomasses of the benthic invertebrates in many groups was seen to drop in the years 1999-2000, apparently due to the increased predation. The relationship between the two trophic levels is thought to be as a consequence of the open and sparsely vegetated bottom, which offers minimal shelter to invertebrate prey.

An additional factor in the reduced invertebrate biomasses was a fall in both phosphorus and chlorophyll a concentrations, which led to a drop in primary production. The phosphorus and chlorophyll a decreases occurred after the three years of fishing and have remained low since. This could be related to the loss of waste products and detritus the fish would have produced over the years.
