= Technofossil =

Human-created artifacts preserved in stratigraphy

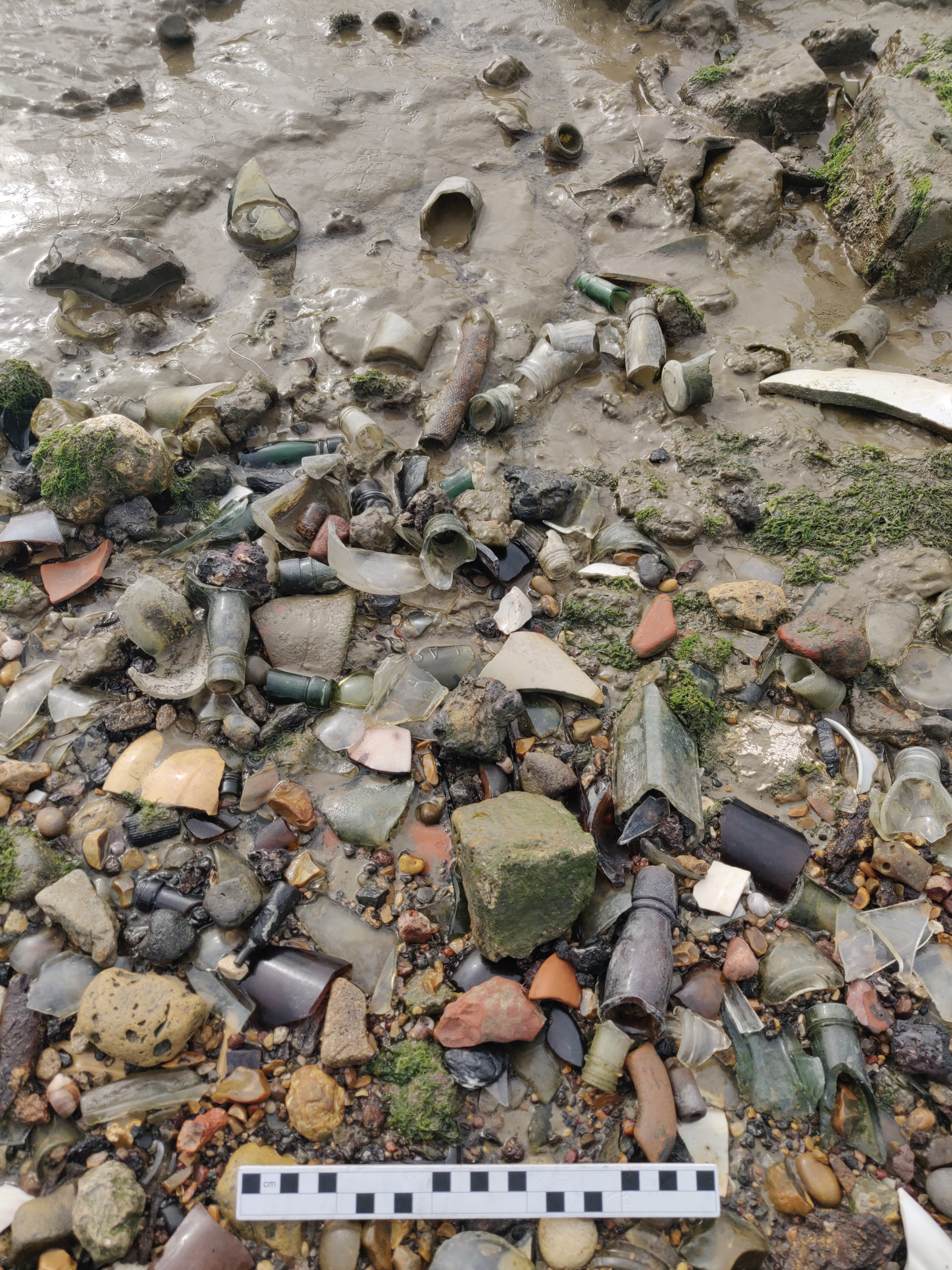
Examples of 20th-century technofossils in inundated landfill deposits at East Tilbury on the River Thames estuary, consisting of several mass-manufactured materials

A technofossil refers to geological evidence of human technological activity preserved in Earth's strata that will persist for millions of years. These anthropogenic materials form distinctive markers in the geological record, with many geologists, paleobiologists, and environmental researchers stating that they would provide future evidence of humanity's industrial and consumer-oriented civilization. Technofossils represent a significant aspect of the proposed Anthropocene epoch, characterized by humanity's profound geological impact on the planet due to the mass production of synthetic resources, modified biological remains, and chemical or radioactive markers.

== Concept ==
The term "technofossil", first coined in 2014, describes manufactured or modified materials that possess sufficient durability to persist in Earth's geological record for millions of years. Unlike traditional biological fossils, technofossils result from human technological processes rather than natural and biological processes. These persistent artifacts form a distinctive stratigraphic signature that several geologists and environmental scientists state will remain identifiable to future geologists or intelligent entities examining Earth's history.

University of Leicester Department of Geology professors Jan Zalasiewicz, Mark Williams, and Sarah Gabbott, consider technofossils a defining characteristic of the Anthropocene. Each theorize that their durability and vast global distribution are in the process of creating an unprecedented geological signature distinct from all previous geological epochs. Williams described technofossils as eventually becoming the "defining imprint" of the Anthropocene, positing that future archaeologists would find the technofossil strata "more weird and wonderful, by far, than dinosaur bones."

== Types ==
=== Manuport ===
A manuport is any natural object that has been deliberately taken from its original environment and relocated without further modification. Typically moved by human hand, some manuports are the result of other hominins.

=== Geomorphology ===
Human activities such as dam building, roads and highways, urban grading, drainage and mining reshaping the terrain.

=== Modified biological materials ===
Humanity's impact on biological organisms will also create distinctive fossil records, for example the presence of planted forests or introduced species. Domesticated chicken bones represent the most numerous bird remains in Earth's history, with approximately 25 billion chickens alive at any moment. Modern broiler chickens exhibit skeletal structures substantially different from their wild ancestors, creating an abrupt morphological transition in the fossil record that many geologists believe would be apparent to future paleontologists. The sudden appearance of these selectively-bred and modified organisms, bred for rapid growth and meat production, can provide evidence of human intervention in biological evolution.

Additionally, human remains in subsiding burial sites can preserve evidence of modern human population demographics, although they would be far outnumbered by the fossils of domesticated animals.

=== Manufactured products ===
==== Plastics ====
Synthetic polymers, due to their exceptional durability, massive production volumes, and global distribution, have led geologists to characterize them as the most ubiquitous and enduring technofossils. Many synthetic polymers exhibit chemical stability comparable to certain natural fossilized materials. Such items include single-use plastic products, particularly from fast food and consumer goods, microplastics distributed throughout marine sediments, and synthetic fabrics and textiles incorporating plastic fibers.

Technofossil at Coves Haven

Paleobiologists such as Zalasiewicz and Gabbott noted that certain ancient organic fossils, such as the cell walls of 50-million-year-old green algae and the organic tubes of graptolites, contain compounds chemically similar to modern polyethylene, suggesting the extraordinary longevity plastic materials will likely exhibit in the geological record.

==== Synthetic textiles ====
Synthetic textiles persist much longer than traditional natural fibers like cotton, linen, and silk, which readily decompose without special preservation conditions. Landfills can effectively mummify discarded clothing, preserving these materials for potential technofossilization. The abrupt appearance of synthetic textiles would mark a clear stratigraphic boundary in the Earth's geological record, as they represent a complete departure from the millennia of biodegradable natural fiber production that preceded them. Modern textile production exceeds 100 billion garments annually, double the amount produced two decades ago.

==== Concrete ====
Concrete, exceeding 500 billion tonnes and possesses intrinsic qualities conducive to technofossilization, represents humanity's most abundant manufactured material. The material's durability, and conditions such as urban centers in subsiding coastal areas, present ideal fossilization conditions. Environmental scientists state that concrete structures in cities like New Orleans, built below sea level, will eventually submerge beneath sediment, preserving foundations, seawalls, and infrastructure. Many geologists predict that these massive concrete deposits will create distinctive lithified zones within future rock strata, preserving the geometric and structural patterns of human civilization.

==== Metals ====
While pure metals themselves rarely persist in geological records due to their reactivity, many geologists predict that metallic products will leave distinctive impressions and mineral formations indicative of prior human civilization.

While aluminum drink containers will eventually dissolve, they can leave characteristic void spaces filled with distinctive clay mineral assemblages. Copper wiring from electronics will gradually transform into copper mineral formations described as "visually striking", including azurite, malachite, and bornite. Metal frameworks will also create distinctive void patterns as they gradually mineralize. Sections of cell phones and wind turbines were also likely to be preserved.

=== Underground technofossils ===
More than 50 million kilometers of drilled oil and gas wells penetrate through geological strata, creating permanent alterations to rock formations. Approximately 1,500 underground nuclear weapon tests have created distinctive spherical cavities lined with melted rock surrounded by complex fracture networks, producing unique geological features that geologists consider unlike any natural process.

Mining operations have left extensive tunnel networks throughout the planet's crust, while boreholes and other excavations create a global network of human-made geological alterations. These underground modifications represent indefinite changes to Earth's subsurface geology.

=== Chemical and radiological signatures ===
Beyond physical artifacts, human civilization has created distinctive chemical signatures that will persist in the geological record. Trace elements and synthetic compounds such as per- and polyfluoroalkyl substances (PFAS), commonly known as "forever chemicals," exhibit extraordinary persistence in the environment, and create distinctive chemical markers in sedimentary deposits. Materials like polytetrafluoroethylene (PTFE) coatings are assessed to likely outlast the metal objects they cover, persisting as thin flexible films in the geological record. Synthetic compounds such as DDT and dioxins demonstrate extreme environmental persistence, comparable to bacterial biomolecules found preserved in 1.6-billion-year-old Australian rocks.

Radioactive isotopes from nuclear weapons testing, particularly those conducted between 1952 and 1963, created a global stratigraphic marker distributed worldwide. Many geologists who proposed the formal declaration of the Anthropocene in 2024 considered the radiological signature as representing the primary candidate for defining the beginning of the epoch.

== Preservation ==
Like traditional fossils, technofossils will require specific conditions for long-term preservation. Burial beneath sediment, particularly in marine or lacustrine environments, are believed to provide the most favorable conditions for preservation. Subsiding coastal urban areas provide proper conditions for preservation of human infrastructure, as gradually sinking land allows for sediment accumulation that protects artifacts from erosion and weathering.

Landfills create artificial preservation environments that inhibit degradation by limiting oxygen exposure and microbial activity. Deep geological formations provide stable preservation environments for subterranean technofossils, protecting them from surface erosional processes.

Many technofossils will release chemicals into the environment over geological timeframes, potentially affecting future ecosystems.

=== Cultural preservation ===
Some technofossils may unintentionally preserve cultural information. Paper documents demonstrate fossilization potential based on preserved ancient leaves and plant materials that underwent similar preservation processes. Graphite from pencils shows considerable geological stability, potentially preserving written or drawn information. Children's drawings are posited to represent potentially enduring human cultural expressions due to their simple graphite composition and potential for burial in sediments. Digital information storage media, despite their abundance, may prove less durable than older analog technologies, creating a potential gap in the cultural record preserved for future study.

== See also ==
- Plasticrust
- Per- and polyfluoroalkyl substances
- Technomass
