= Biomass (energy) =

Biological material used as a renewable energy source

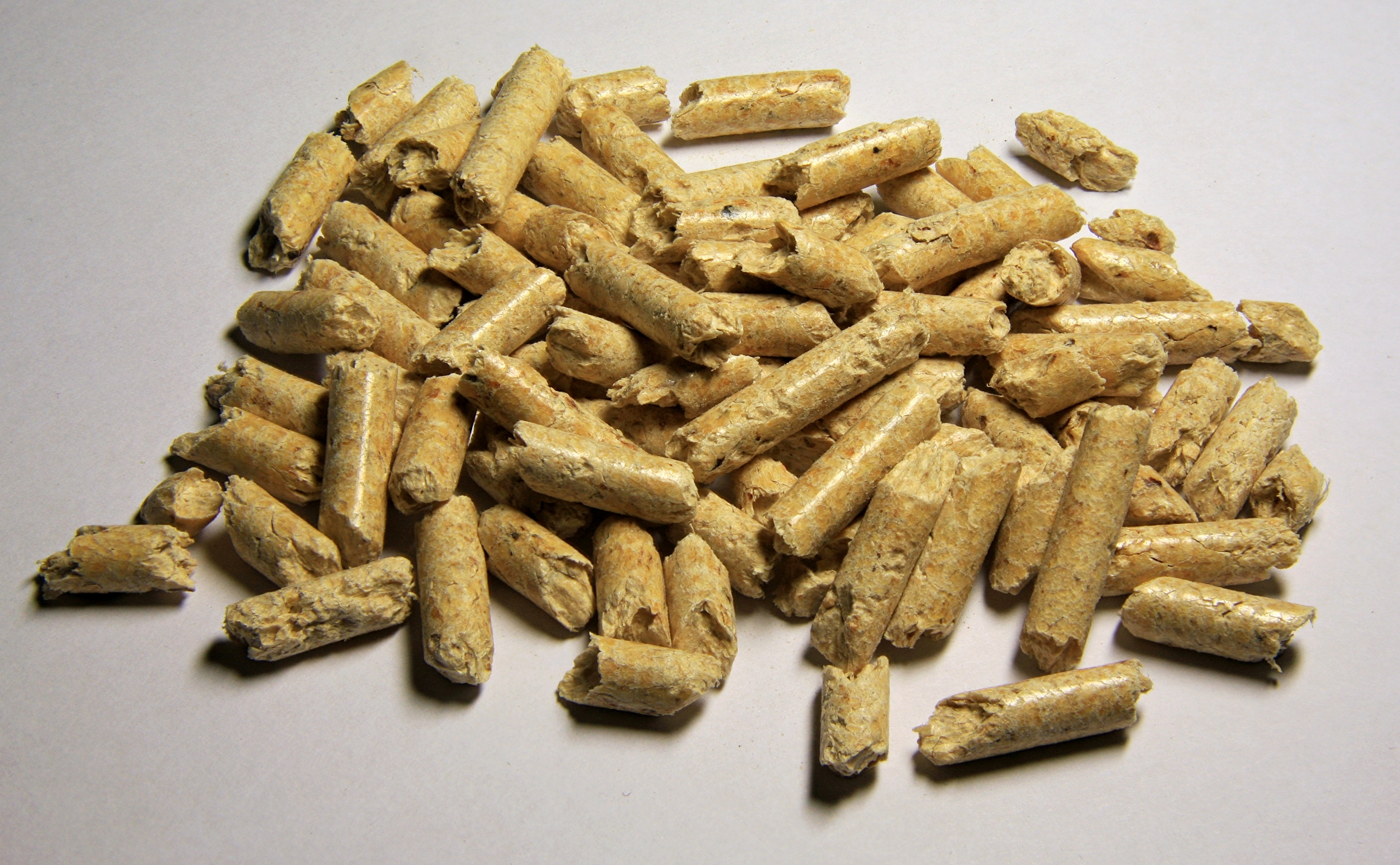
Wood pellets is an example of biomass used for bioenergy production, usually for heating purposes.

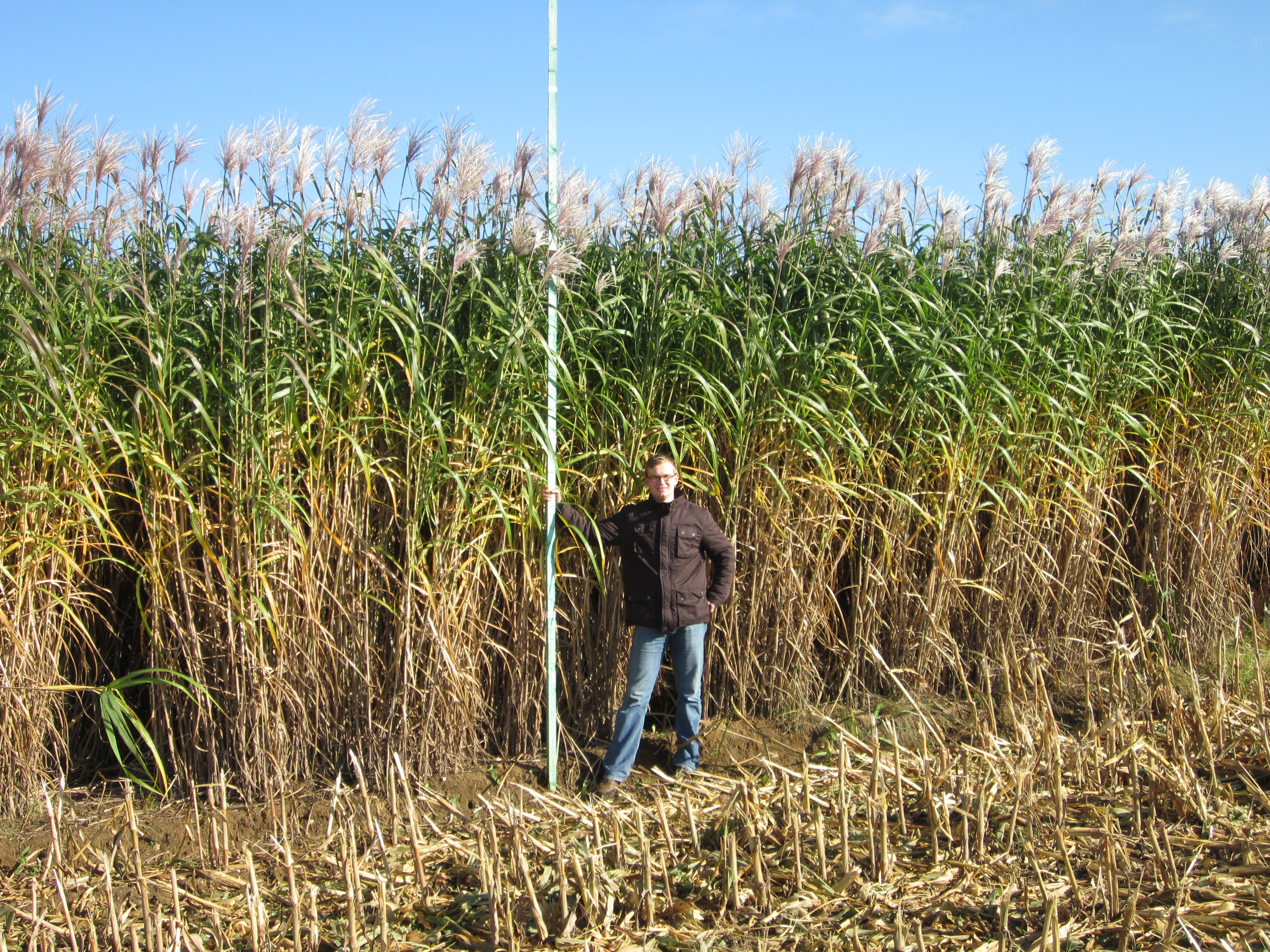
Miscanthus × giganteus, a perennial grass, can also be used for bioenergy production.

In the context of energy production, biomass is matter from recently living (but now dead) organisms which is used for bioenergy production. Examples include wood, wood residues, energy crops, agricultural residues including straw, and organic waste from industry and households. Wood and wood residues is the largest biomass energy source today. Wood can be used as a fuel directly or processed into pellet fuel or other forms of fuels. Other plants can also be used as fuel, for instance maize, switchgrass, miscanthus and bamboo. The main waste feedstocks are wood waste, agricultural waste, municipal solid waste, and manufacturing waste. Upgrading raw biomass to higher grade fuels can be achieved by different methods, broadly classified as thermal, chemical, or biochemical.

The climate impact of bioenergy varies considerably depending on where biomass feedstocks come from and how they are grown. For example, burning wood for energy releases carbon dioxide. Those emissions can be significantly offset if the trees that were harvested are replaced by new trees in a well-managed forest, as the new trees will remove carbon dioxide from the air as they grow. However, the farming of biomass feedstocks can reduce biodiversity, degrade soils and take land out of food production. It may also consume water for irrigation and fertilisers.

Global cultivable land and water resources are adequate to produce required biomass for food and supplementing carbon neutral energy needs where renewable electricity could not be used economically. Using biomass and renewable electricity in place of fossil fuels for the total energy needs of global peak population would not increase the anthropogenic green house gas emissions. Biomass economy has potential to emerge next to renewable energy economy.

== Terminology ==
Biomass (in the context of energy generation) is matter from recently living (but now dead) organisms which is used for bioenergy production. There are variations in how such biomass for energy is defined, e.g. only from plants, or from plants and algae, or from plants and animals. The vast majority of biomass used for bioenergy does come from plants. Bioenergy is a type of renewable energy with potential to assist with climate change mitigation.

Some people use the terms biomass and biofuel interchangeably, but it is now more common to consider biofuel to be a liquid or gaseous fuel used for transportation, as defined by government authorities in the US and EU. (Note: In EU legislation, biofuel is defined as: "Liquid or gaseous fuel for transport produced from biomass." See European Commission 2018a.) From that perspective, biofuel is a subset of biomass.

The European Union's Joint Research Centre defines solid biofuel as raw or processed organic matter of biological origin used for energy, such as firewood, wood chips, and wood pellets.

== Types and uses ==
Energy content of different fuels in the order of heating value
Fuel type	%H + %C	Higher heating value	Comment
Natural gas (methane)	100	55	
Diesel fuel	100	46	lower than methane because lower H/C ratio
Coal (bituminous)	81	31	partially oxygenated
Saw dust	53	20	highly oxygenated

As seen from the table above, the chief problem with biomass, such as saw dust, as an energy source is that it has far lower energy content relative to fossil fuels.

Different types of biomass are used for different purposes:

- Primary biomass sources that are appropriate for heat or electricity generation but not for transport include: wood, wood residues, wood pellets, agricultural residues, organic waste.
- Biomass that is processed into transport fuels can come from corn, sugar cane, and soy.

Biomass is categorized either as biomass harvested directly for energy (primary biomass), or as residues and waste: (secondary biomass).

=== Biomass harvested directly for energy ===
The main biomass types harvested directly for energy is wood, some food crops and all perennial energy crops. One third of the global forest area of 4 billion hectares is used for wood production or other commercial purposes, and forests provide 85% of all biomass used for energy globally. In the EU, forests provide 60% of all biomass used for energy, with wood residues and waste being the largest source.

Woody biomass used for energy often consists of trees and bushes harvested for traditional cooking and heating purposes, particularly in developing countries, with 25 EJ per year used globally for these purposes. This practice is highly polluting. The World Health Organization (WHO) estimates that cooking-related pollution causes 3.8 million annual deaths. The United Nations Sustainable Development Goal 7 aims for the traditional use of biomass for cooking to be phased out by 2030. Short-rotation coppices and short-rotation forests are also harvested directly for energy, providing 4 EJ of energy, and are considered sustainable. The potential for these crops and perennial energy crops to provide at least 25 EJ annually by 2050 is estimated. (Note: IEA 2021b, p. 212.)

Food crops harvested for energy include sugar-producing crops (such as sugarcane), starch-producing crops (such as maize), and oil-producing crops (such as rapeseed). Sugarcane is a perennial crop, while corn and rapeseed are annual crops. Sugar- and starch-producing crops are used to make bioethanol, and oil-producing crops are used to make biodiesel. The United States is the largest producer of bioethanol, while the European Union is the largest producer of biodiesel. The global production of bioethanol and biodiesel provides 2.2 and 1.5 EJ of energy per year, respectively. Biofuel made from food crops harvested for energy is also known as "first-generation" or "traditional" biofuel and has relatively low emission savings.

The IPCC estimates that between 0.32 and 1.4 billion hectares of marginal land are suitable for bioenergy worldwide. (Note: IPCC 2019c, p. 193.)

=== Biomass in the form of residues and waste ===
Residues and waste are by-products from biological material harvested mainly for non-energy purposes. The most important by-products are wood residues, agricultural residues and municipal/industrial waste:

Wood residues are by-products from forestry operations or from the wood processing industry. Had the residues not been collected and used for bioenergy, they would have decayed (and therefore produced emissions) on the forest floor or in landfills, or been burnt (and produced emissions) at the side of the road in forests or outside wood processing facilities.

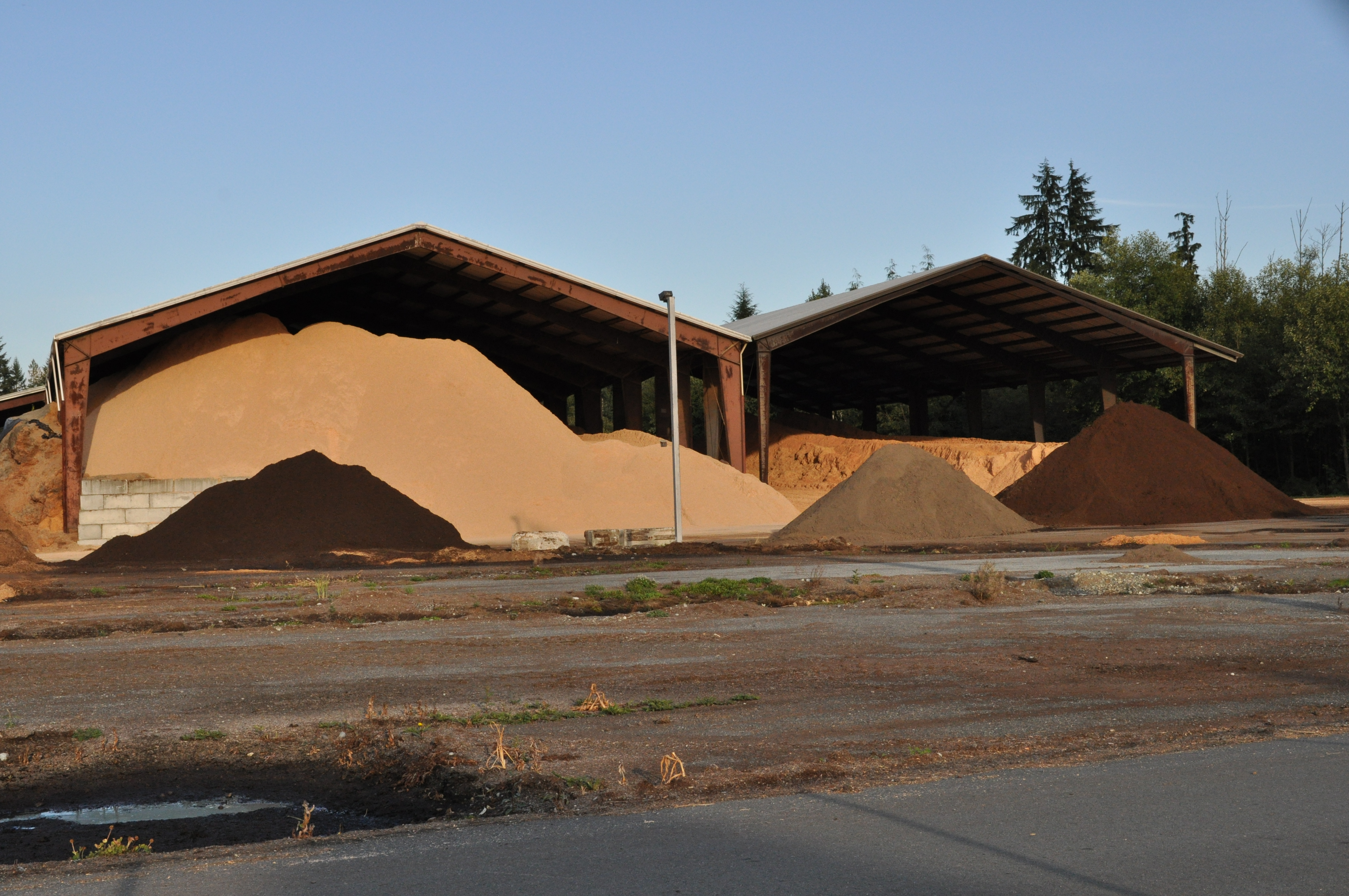
Sawdust is residue from the wood processing industry.

The by-products from forestry operations are called logging residues or forest residues, and consist of tree tops, branches, stumps, damaged or dying or dead trees, irregular or bent stem sections, thinnings (small trees that are cleared away in order to help the bigger trees grow large), and trees removed to reduce wildfire risk. (Note: JRC 2014, pp. 42–43, table 3.) The extraction level of logging residues differ from region to region, (Note: Pokharel et al. 2019, p. 543.) but there is an increasing interest in using this feedstock, (Note: Dahlberg et al. 2011, p. 1220) since the sustainable potential is large (15 EJ annually). (Note: van den Born et al. distinguish between logging residues in general and dead wood, with the logging residues potential at 14 EJ, and the dead wood potential at 1 EJ annually. For the logging residues potential, see van den Born et al. 2014, p. 20, table 4.2.) 68% of the total forest biomass in the EU consists of wood stems, and 32% consists of stumps, branches and tops.

The by-products from the wood processing industry are called wood processing residues and consist of cut offs, shavings, sawdust, bark, and black liquor. Wood processing residues have a total energy content of 5.5 EJ annually. Wood pellets are mainly made from wood processing residues, and have a total energy content of 0.7 EJ. (Note: Recalculated from a total production of 43678925 tonnes wood pellets (FAO 2020), with 17 GJ/t energy content.) Wood chips are made from a combination of feedstocks, and have a total energy content of 0.8 EJ. (Note: Recalculated from a total production of 265212933 m^{3} wood chips (FAO 2020), with 3.1 GJ/m^{3} energy content.)

The energy content in agricultural residues used for energy is approximately 2 EJ. However, agricultural residues has a large untapped potential. The energy content in the global production of agricultural residues has been estimated to 78 EJ annually, with the largest share from straw (51 EJ). Others have estimated between 18 and 82 EJ. The use of agricultural residues and waste that is both sustainable and economically feasible is expected to increase to between 37 and 66 EJ in 2030.

Municipal waste produced 1.4 EJ and industrial waste 1.1 EJ. Wood waste from cities and industry also produced 1.1 EJ. The sustainable potential for wood waste has been estimated to 2–10 EJ. IEA recommends a dramatic increase in waste utilization to 45 EJ annually in 2050.

== Biomass conversion ==
Raw biomass can be upgraded into better and more practical fuel simply by compacting it (e.g. wood pellets), or by different conversions broadly classified as thermal, chemical, and biochemical. Biomass conversion reduces the transport costs as it is cheaper to transport high density commodities.

=== Thermal conversion ===
Thermal upgrading produces solid, liquid or gaseous fuels, with heat as the dominant conversion driver. The basic alternatives are torrefaction, pyrolysis, and gasification, these are separated principally by how far the chemical reactions involved are allowed to proceed. The advancement of the chemical reactions is mainly controlled by how much oxygen is available, and the conversion temperature.

Torrefaction is a mild form of pyrolysis where organic materials are heated to 400–600 °F (200–300 °C) in a no–to–low oxygen environment. The heating process removes (via gasification) the parts of the biomass that has the lowest energy content, while the parts with the highest energy content remain. Approximately 30% of the biomass is converted to gas during the torrefaction process, while 70% remains, usually in the form of compacted pellets or briquettes. This solid product is water resistant, easy to grind, non-corrosive, and contains approximately 85% of the original biomass energy. Basically the mass part has shrunk more than the energy part, and the consequence is that the calorific value of torrefied biomass increases significantly, to the extent that it can compete with coals used for electricity generation (steam/thermal coals). The energy density of the most common steam coals today is 22–26 GJ/t. There are other less common, more experimental or proprietary thermal processes that may offer benefits, such as hydrothermal upgrading (sometimes called "wet" torrefaction.) (Note: Smith et al. 2018, pp. 547, 556.) The hydrothermal upgrade path can be used for both low and high moisture content biomass, e.g. aqueous slurries. Torrefied biomass, biochar and bio-coke can be used in blast furnaces to produce green steel, green urea/ammonia/hydrogen and green slag cement.

Pyrolysis entails heating organic materials to 800–900 °F (400–500 °C) in the near complete absence of oxygen. Biomass pyrolysis produces fuels such as bio-oil, charcoal, methane, and hydrogen. Hydrotreating is used to process bio-oil (produced by fast pyrolysis) with hydrogen under elevated temperatures and pressures in the presence of a catalyst to produce renewable diesel, renewable gasoline, and renewable jet fuel.

Gasification entails heating organic materials to 1,400–1700 °F (800–900 °C) with injections of controlled amounts of oxygen and/or steam into the vessel to produce a carbon monoxide and hydrogen rich gas called synthesis gas or syngas. Syngas can be used as a fuel for diesel engines, for heating, and for generating electricity in gas turbines. It can also be treated to separate the hydrogen from the gas, and the hydrogen can be burned or used in fuel cells. The syngas can be further processed to produce liquid fuels using the Fischer-Tropsch synthesis process.

=== Chemical conversion ===
Biomass may be converted to other forms through a range of chemical processes, either to produce a fuel that is easier to store, transport, and use, or to exploit some property inherent in the conversion process. Many of these processes are based in large part on similar coal-based processes, such as the Fischer-Tropsch synthesis. A chemical conversion process known as transesterification is used for converting vegetable oils, animal fats, and greases into fatty acid methyl esters (FAME), which are used to produce biodiesel.

=== Biochemical conversion ===
Biochemical processes have developed in nature to break down the molecules of which biomass is composed, and many of these can be harnessed. In most cases, microorganisms are used to perform the conversion. The processes are called anaerobic digestion, fermentation, and composting.

Fermentation converts biomass into bioethanol, and anaerobic digestion converts biomass into renewable natural gas (biogas). Bioethanol is used as a vehicle fuel. Renewable natural gas—also called biogas or biomethane—is produced in anaerobic digesters at sewage treatment plants and at dairy and livestock operations. It also forms in and may be captured from solid waste landfills. Properly treated renewable natural gas has the same uses as fossil fuel natural gas.

== Climate impacts ==
The climate impact of bioenergy varies considerably depending on where biomass feedstocks come from and how they are grown. For example, burning wood for energy releases carbon dioxide; those emissions can be significantly offset if the trees that were harvested are replaced by new trees in a well-managed forest, as the new trees will absorb carbon dioxide from the air as they grow. However, the establishment and cultivation of bioenergy crops can displace natural ecosystems, degrade soils, and consume water resources and synthetic fertilisers.

Approximately one-third of all wood used for traditional heating and cooking in tropical areas is harvested unsustainably. Bioenergy feedstocks typically require significant amounts of energy to harvest, dry, and transport; the energy usage for these processes may emit greenhouse gases. In some cases, the impacts of land-use change, cultivation, and processing can result in higher overall carbon emissions for bioenergy compared to using fossil fuels.

Use of farmland for growing biomass can result in less land being available for growing food. In the United States, around 10% of motor gasoline has been replaced by corn-based ethanol, which requires a significant proportion of the harvest. In Malaysia and Indonesia, clearing forests to produce palm oil for biodiesel has led to serious social and environmental effects, as these forests are critical carbon sinks and habitats for diverse species. Since photosynthesis captures only a small fraction of the energy in sunlight, producing a given amount of bioenergy requires a large amount of land compared to other renewable energy sources.

=== Short-term vs long-term climate benefits ===
Regarding the issue of climate consequences for modern bioenergy, IPCC states: "Life-cycle GHG emissions of modern bioenergy alternatives are usually lower than those for fossil fuels." Consequently, most of IPCC's GHG mitigation pathways include substantial deployment of bioenergy technologies.

Some research groups state that even if the European and North American forest carbon stock is increasing, it simply takes too long for harvested trees to grow back. Bioenergy from sources with high payback and parity times take a long time to have an impact on climate change mitigation. They therefore suggest that the EU should adjust its sustainability criteria so that only renewable energy with carbon payback times of less than 10 years is defined as sustainable, for instance wind, solar, biomass from wood residues and tree thinnings that would otherwise be burnt or decompose relatively fast, and biomass from short rotation coppicing (SRC).

The IPCC states: "While individual stands in a forest may be either sources or sinks, the forest carbon balance is determined by the sum of the net balance of all stands." IPCC also state that the only universally applicable approach to carbon accounting is the one that accounts for both carbon emissions and carbon removals (absorption) for managed lands (e.g. forest landscapes.) When the total is calculated, natural disturbances like fires and insect infestations are subtracted, and what remains is the human influence. (Note: See IPCC 2006b, p. 1.5.)

IEA Bioenergy state that an exclusive focus on the short-term make it harder to achieve efficient carbon mitigation in the long term, and compare investments in new bioenergy technologies with investments in other renewable energy technologies that only provide emission reductions after 2030, for instance the scaling-up of battery manufacturing or the development of rail infrastructure. Forest carbon emission avoidance strategies give a short-term mitigation benefit, but the long-term benefits from sustainable forestry activities provide ongoing forest product and energy resources.

Most of IPCC's GHG mitigation pathways include substantial deployment of bioenergy technologies. Limited or no bioenergy pathways leads to increased climate change or shifting bioenergy's mitigation load to other sectors. (Note: IPCC 2019e, p. 637.) In addition, mitigation cost increases. (Note: IPCC 2019e, p. 638.)

=== Carbon accounting system boundaries ===
Carbon positive scenarios are likely to be net emitters of CO_{2}, carbon negative projects are net absorbers of CO_{2}, while carbon neutral projects balance emissions and absorption equally.

It is common to include alternative scenarios (also called "reference scenarios" or "counterfactuals") for comparison. The alternative scenarios range from scenarios with only modest changes compared to the existing project, all the way to radically different ones (i.e. forest protection or "no-bioenergy" counterfactuals.) Generally, the difference between scenarios is seen as the actual carbon mitigation potential of the scenarios.

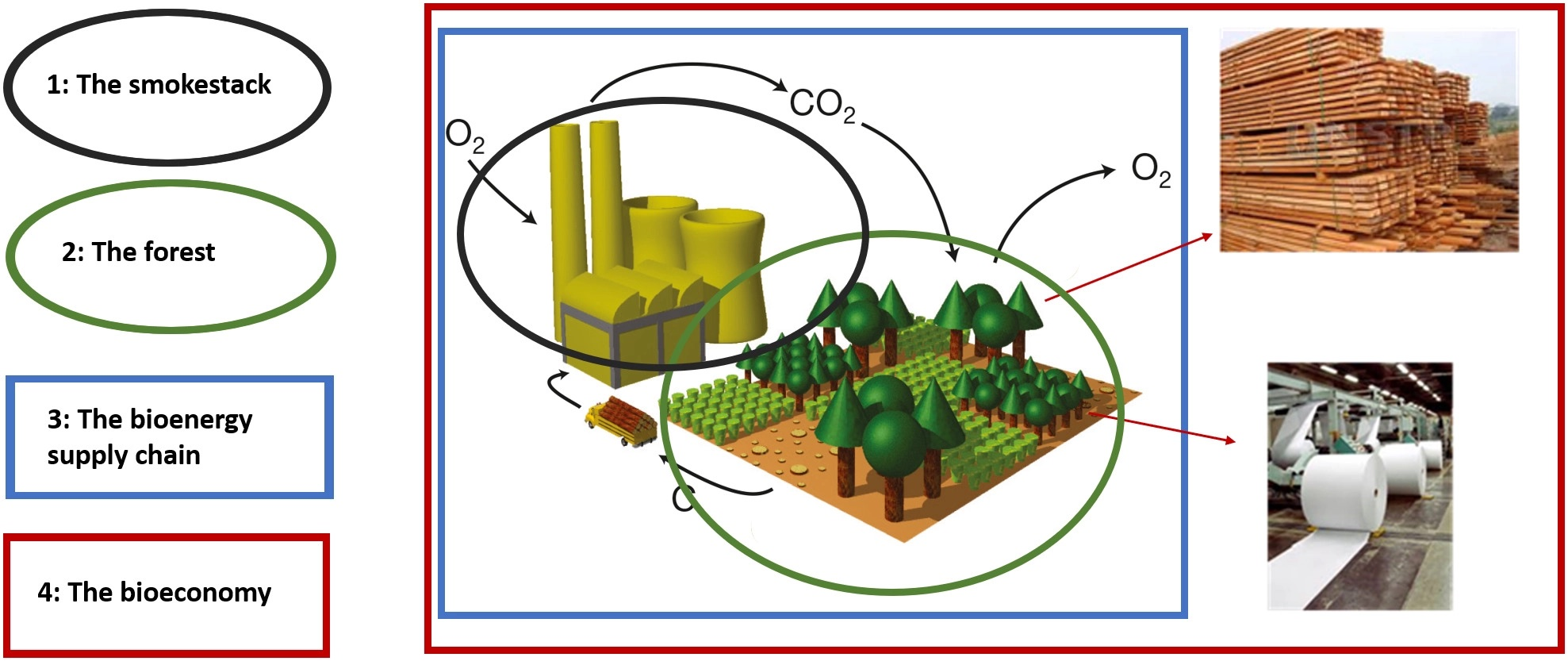
Alternative system boundaries for assessing climate effects of forest-based bioenergy. Option 1 (black) considers only the stack emissions; Option 2 (green) considers only the forest carbon stock; Option 3 (blue) considers the bioenergy supply chain; Option 4 (red) covers the whole bioeconomy, including wood products in addition to biomass.

In addition to the choice of alternative scenario, other choices has to be made as well. The so-called "system boundaries" determine which carbon emissions/absorptions that will be included in the actual calculation, and which that will be excluded. System boundaries include temporal, spatial, efficiency-related and economic boundaries.

For example, the actual carbon intensity of bioenergy varies with biomass production techniques and transportation lengths.

==== Temporal system boundaries ====
The temporal boundaries define when to start and end carbon counting. Sometimes "early" events are included in the calculation, for instance carbon absorption going on in the forest before the initial harvest. Sometimes "late" events are included as well, for instance emissions caused by end-of-life activities for the infrastructure involved, e.g. demolition of factories. Since the emission and absorption of carbon related to a project or scenario changes with time, the net carbon emission can either be presented as time-dependent (for instance a curve which moves along a time axis), or as a static value; this shows average emissions calculated over a defined time period.

The time-dependent net emission curve will typically show high emissions at the beginning (if the counting starts when the biomass is harvested.) Alternatively, the starting point can be moved back to the planting event; in this case the curve can potentially move below zero (into carbon negative territory) if there is no carbon debt from land use change to pay back, and in addition more and more carbon is absorbed by the planted trees. The emission curve then spikes upward at harvest. The harvested carbon is then being distributed into other carbon pools, and the curve moves in tandem with the amount of carbon that is moved into these new pools (Y axis), and the time it takes for the carbon to move out of the pools and return to the forest via the atmosphere (X axis). As described above, the carbon payback time is the time it takes for the harvested carbon to be returned to the forest, and the carbon parity time is the time it takes for the carbon stored in two competing scenarios to reach the same level. (Note: A simplified curve, complete with carbon payback and parity times, is available here: EASAC 2017, p. 23.)

The static carbon emission value is produced by calculating the average annual net emission for a specific time period. The specific time period can be the expected lifetime of the infrastructure involved (typical for life cycle assessments; LCA's), policy relevant time horizons inspired by the Paris agreement (for instance remaining time until 2030, 2050 or 2100), time spans based on different global warming potentials (GWP; typically 20 or 100 years), or other time spans. In the EU, a time span of 20 years is used when quantifying the net carbon effects of a land use change. (Note: European Parliament, Council of the European Union 2018, p. Annex VI.) Generally in legislation, the static number approach is preferred over the dynamic, time-dependent curve approach. The number is expressed as a so-called "emission factor" (net emission per produced energy unit, for instance kg CO_{2}e per GJ), or even simpler as an average greenhouse gas savings percentage for specific bioenergy pathways. (Note: See for instance the European Union's official emission savings percentages for different fuels here: European Parliament, Council of the European Union 2018, p. ANNEX VI. Note that these estimates do not include the average net emissions which results from an eventual land use change prior to planting.) The EU's published greenhouse gas savings percentages for specific bioenergy pathways used in the Renewable Energy Directive (RED) and other legal documents are based on life cycle assessments (LCA's).

==== Spatial system boundaries ====
The spatial boundaries define "geographical" borders for carbon emission/absorption calculations. The two most common spatial boundaries for CO_{2} absorption and emission in forests are 1.) along the edges of a particular forest stand and 2.) along the edges of a whole forest landscape, which include many forest stands of increasing age (the forest stands are harvested and replanted, one after the other, over as many years as there are stands.) A third option is the so-called increasing stand level carbon accounting method. The researcher has to decide whether to focus on the individual stand, an increasing number of stands, or the whole forest landscape. The IPCC recommends landscape-level carbon accounting.

Further, the researcher has to decide whether emissions from direct/indirect land use change should be included in the calculation. Most researchers include emissions from direct land use change, for instance the emissions caused by cutting down a forest in order to start some agricultural project there instead. The inclusion of indirect land use change effects is more controversial, as they are difficult to quantify accurately. (Note: IPCC 2019i, p. 194.) (Note: See Bird et al. 2010, p. 5, and also Searchinger et al. 2008, pp. 1238–1240 for the original research article.) Other choices involve defining the likely spatial boundaries of forests in the future.

==== Efficiency-related system boundaries ====
The efficiency-related boundaries define a range of fuel substitution efficiencies for different biomass-combustion pathways. Different supply chains emit different amounts of carbon per supplied energy unit, and different combustion facilities convert the chemical energy stored in different fuels to heat or electrical energy with different efficiencies. The researcher has to know about this and choose a realistic efficiency range for the different biomass-combustion paths under consideration. The chosen efficiencies are used to calculate so-called "displacement factors" – single numbers that shows how efficient fossil carbon is substituted by biogenic carbon. If for instance 10 tonnes of carbon are combusted with an efficiency half that of a modern coal plant, only 5 tonnes of coal would actually be counted as displaced (displacement factor 0.5).

Generally, fuel burned in inefficient (old or small) combustion facilities gets assigned lower displacement factors than fuel burned in efficient (new or large) facilities, since more fuel has to be burned (and therefore more CO_{2} released) in order to produce the same amount of energy.

The displacement factor varies with the carbon intensity of both the biomass fuel and the displaced fossil fuel. If or when bioenergy can achieve negative emissions (e.g. from afforestation, energy grass plantations and/or bioenergy with carbon capture and storage (BECCS), or if fossil fuel energy sources with higher emissions in the supply chain start to come online (e.g. because of fracking, or increased use of shale gas), the displacement factor will start to rise. On the other hand, if or when new baseload energy sources with lower emissions than fossil fuels start to come online, the displacement factor will start to drop. Whether a displacement factor change is included in the calculation or not, depends on whether or not it is expected to take place within the time period covered by the relevant scenario's temporal system boundaries. (Note: JRC 2014, pp. 23, 51–52. Note that the JRC use the term "payback time" in the sense of "parity time" as defined in Carbon accounting principles above. See JRC 2014, p. 16.)

==== Economic system boundaries ====
The economic boundaries define which market effects to include in the calculation, if any. Changed market conditions can lead to small or large changes in carbon emissions and absorptions from supply chains and forests, for instance changes in forest area as a response to changes in demand. Macroeconomic events/policy changes can have impacts on forest carbon stock. Like with indirect land use changes, economic changes can be difficult to quantify however, so some researchers prefer to leave them out of the calculation. (Note: See for instance Camia et al. 2021, pp. 86, 100.)

==== System boundary impacts ====
The chosen system boundaries are very important for the calculated results. Shorter payback/parity times are calculated when fossil carbon intensity, forest growth rate and biomass conversion efficiency increases, or when the initial forest carbon stock and/or harvest level decreases. Shorter payback/parity times are also calculated when the researcher choose landscape level over stand level carbon accounting (if carbon accounting starts at the harvest rather than at the planting event.) Conversely, longer payback/parity times are calculated when carbon intensity, growth rate and conversion efficiency decreases, or when the initial carbon stock and/or harvest level increases, or the researcher choose stand level over landscape level carbon accounting. (Note: Jonker, Junginger & Faaij 2014, pp. 371–387.)

Critics argue that unrealistic system boundary choices are made, or that narrow system boundaries lead to misleading conclusions. Others argue that the wide range of results shows that there is too much leeway available and that the calculations therefore are useless for policy development. (Note: Bentsen 2017, p. 1211.) EU's Join Research Center agrees that different methodologies produce different results, but also argue that this is to be expected, since different researchers consciously or unconsciously choose different alternative scenarios/methodologies as a result of their ethical ideals regarding man's optimal relationship with nature. The ethical core of the sustainability debate should be made explicit by researchers, rather than hidden away.

=== Comparisons of GHG emissions at the point of combustion ===
GHG emissions per produced energy unit at the point of combustion depend on moisture content in the fuel, chemical differences between fuels and conversion efficiencies. For example, raw biomass can have higher moisture content compared to some common coal types. When this is the case, more of the wood's inherent energy must be spent solely on evaporating moisture, compared to the drier coal, which means that the amount of CO_{2} emitted per unit of produced heat will be higher.

Many biomass-only combustion facilities are relatively small and inefficient, compared to the typically much larger coal plants. Further, raw biomass (for instance wood chips) can have higher moisture content than coal (especially if the coal has been dried). When this is the case, more of the wood's inherent energy must be spent solely on evaporating moisture, compared to the drier coal, which means that the amount of CO_{2} emitted per unit produced heat will be higher. This moisture problem can be mitigated by modern combustion facilities. (Note: Hektor, Backéus & Andersson 2016, p. 4. See also OECD/IEA 2004, p. 20.)

Forest biomass on average produces 10-16% more CO_{2} than coal. However, focusing on gross emissions misses the point, what counts is the net climate effect from emissions and absorption, taken together. IEA Bioenergy concludes that the additional CO_{2} from biomass "[...] is irrelevant if the biomass is derived from sustainably managed forests."

=== Climate impacts expressed as varying with time ===
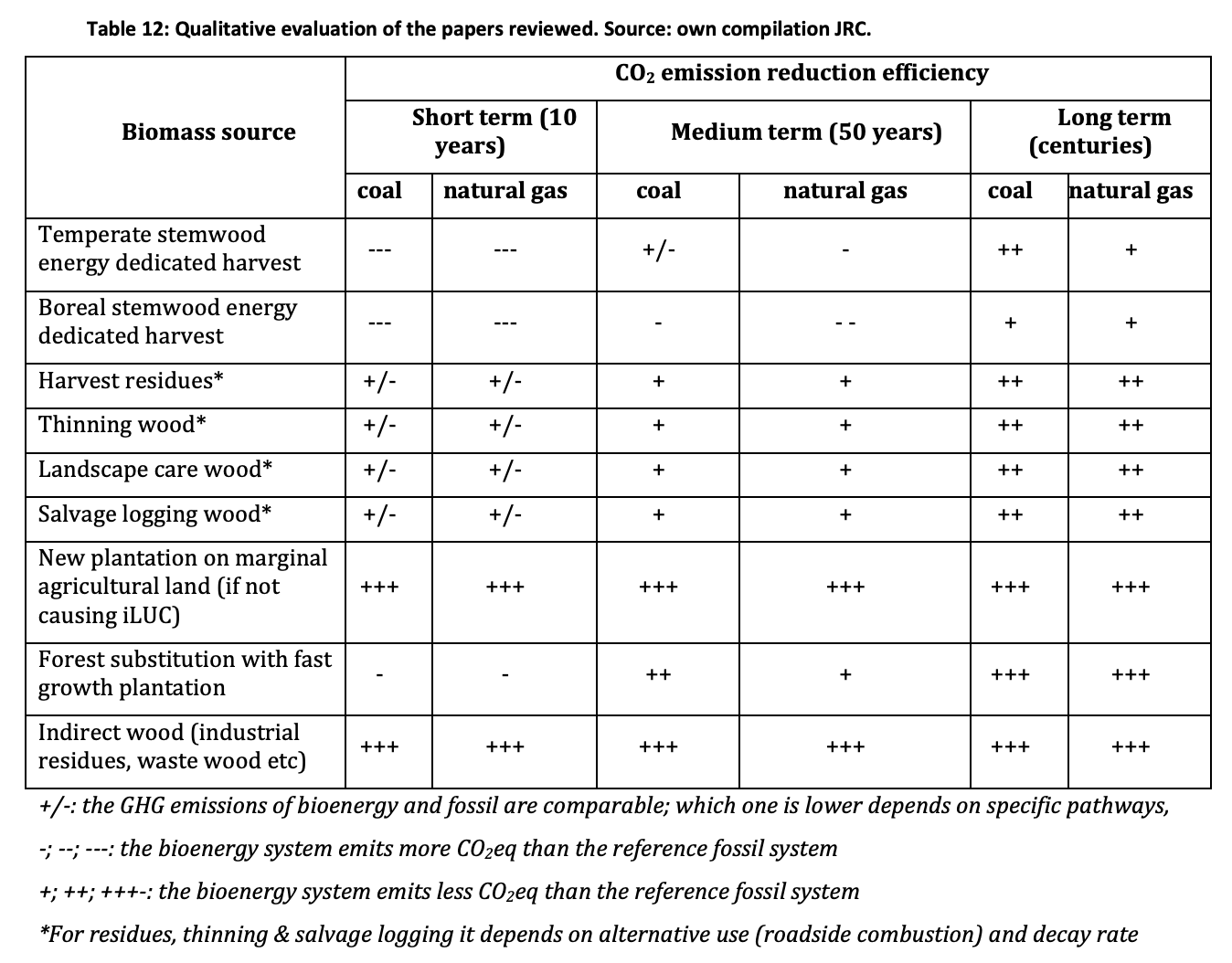
Time-dependent net emission estimates for forest bioenergy pathways, compared against coal and natural gas alternative scenarios. Plus signs represents positive climate effects, minus signs negative climate effects.

The use of boreal stemwood harvested exclusively for bioenergy have a positive climate impact only in the long term, while the use of wood residues have a positive climate impact also in the short to medium term.

Short carbon payback/parity times are produced when the most realistic no-bioenergy scenario is a traditional forestry scenario where "good" wood stems are harvested for lumber production, and residues are burned or left behind in the forest or in landfills. The collection of such residues provides material which "[...] would have released its carbon (via decay or burning) back to the atmosphere anyway (over time spans defined by the biome's decay rate) [...]." In other words, payback and parity times depend on the decay speed. The decay speed depends on a.) location (because decay speed is "[...] roughly proportional to temperature and rainfall [...]"), and b.) the thickness of the residues. (Note: Camia et al. 2021, p. 143. See also JRC 2014, pp. 16–17, 43–44.) Residues decay faster in warm and wet areas, and thin residues decay faster than thick residues. Thin residues in warm and wet temperate forests therefore have the fastest decay, while thick residues in cold and dry boreal forests have the slowest decay. If the residues instead are burned in the no-bioenergy scenario, e.g. outside the factories or at roadside in the forests, emissions are instant. In this case, parity times approach zero. (Note: Lamers & Junginger 2013, p. 379.)

Like other scientists, the JRC staff note the high variability in carbon accounting results, and attribute this to different methodologies. In the studies examined, the JRC found carbon parity times of 0 to 400 years for stemwood harvested exclusively for bioenergy, depending on different characteristics and assumptions for both the forest/bioenergy system and the alternative fossil system, with the emission intensity of the displaced fossil fuels seen as the most important factor, followed by conversion efficiency and biomass growth rate/rotation time. Other factors relevant for the carbon parity time are the initial carbon stock and the existing harvest level; both higher initial carbon stock and higher harvest level means longer parity times. Liquid biofuels have high parity times because about half of the energy content of the biomass is lost in the processing. (Note: JRC 2014, p. 34. Note that the JRC use the term "payback time" in the sense of "parity time" as defined in Carbon accounting principles above. See JRC 2014, p. 16.)

=== Climate impacts expressed as static numbers ===
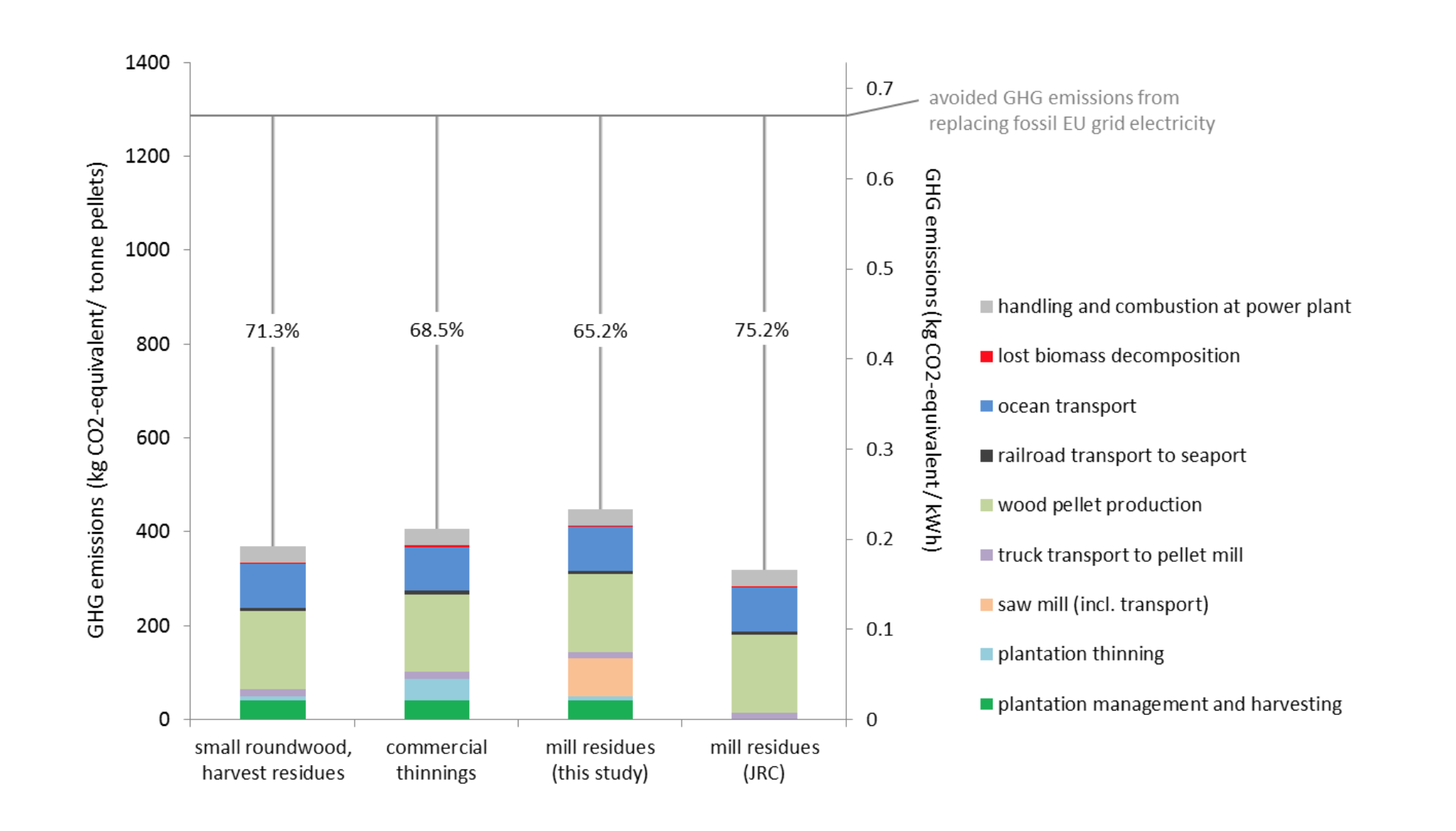
Greenhouse gas emissions from wood pellet production and transport from the US to the EU.

EU's Joint Research Centre has examined a number of bioenergy emission estimates found in literature, and calculated greenhouse gas savings percentages for bioenergy pathways in heat production, transportation fuel production and electricity production, based on those studies. The calculations are based on the attributional LCA accounting principle. It includes all supply chain emissions, from raw material extraction, through energy and material production and manufacturing, to end-of-life treatment and final disposal. It also includes emissions related to the production of the fossil fuels used in the supply chain. It excludes emission/absorption effects that takes place outside its system boundaries, for instance market related, biogeophysical (e.g. albedo), and time-dependent effects. The authors conclude that "[m]ost bio-based commodities release less GHG than fossil products along their supply chain; but the magnitude of GHG emissions vary greatly with logistics, type of feedstocks, land and ecosystem management, resource efficiency, and technology."

Because of the varied climate mitigation potential for different biofuel pathways, governments and organizations set up different certification schemes to ensure that biomass use is sustainable, for instance the RED (Renewable Energy Directive) in the EU and the ISO standard 13065 by the International Organization for Standardization. In the US, the RFS (Renewables Fuel Standard) limit the use of traditional biofuels and defines the minimum life-cycle GHG emissions that are acceptable. Biofuels are considered traditional if they achieve up to 20% GHG emission reduction compared to the petrochemical equivalent, advanced if they save at least 50%, and cellulosic if the save more than 60%.

The EU's Renewable Energy Directive (RED) states that the typical greenhouse gas emissions savings when replacing fossil fuels with wood pellets from forest residues for heat production varies between 69% and 77%, depending on transport distance: When the distance is between 0 and 2500 km, emission savings is 77%. Emission savings drop to 75% when the distance is between 2500 and 10 000 km, and to 69% when the distance is above 10 000 km. When stemwood is used, emission savings varies between 70% and 77%, depending on transport distance. When wood industry residues are used, savings varies between 79% and 87%. (Note: European Parliament, Council of the European Union 2018, p. Annex VI.)

Since the long payback and parity times calculated for some forestry projects is seen as a non-issue for energy crops (except in the cases mentioned above), researchers instead calculate static climate mitigation potentials for these crops, using LCA-based carbon accounting methods. A particular energy crop-based bioenergy project is considered carbon positive, carbon neutral or carbon negative based on the total amount of CO_{2} equivalent emissions and absorptions accumulated throughout its entire lifetime: If emissions during agriculture, processing, transport and combustion are higher than what is absorbed (and stored) by the plants, both above and below ground, during the project's lifetime, the project is carbon positive. Likewise, if total absorption is higher than total emissions, the project is carbon negative. In other words, carbon negativity is possible when net carbon accumulation more than compensates for net lifecycle greenhouse gas emissions.

Typically, perennial crops sequester more carbon than annual crops because the root buildup is allowed to continue undisturbed over many years. Also, perennial crops avoid the yearly tillage procedures (plowing, digging) associated with growing annual crops. Tilling helps the soil microbe populations to decompose the available carbon, producing CO_{2}. (Note: "Any soil disturbance, such as ploughing and cultivation, is likely to result in short-term respiration losses of soil organic carbon, decomposed by stimulated soil microbe populations (Cheng, 2009; Kuzyakov, 2010). Annual disturbance under arable cropping repeats this year after year resulting in reduced SOC levels. Perennial agricultural systems, such as grassland, have time to replace their infrequent disturbance losses which can result in higher steady-state soil carbon contents (Gelfand et al., 2011; Zenone et al., 2013)." McCalmont et al. 2017, p. 493.)

There is now (2018) consensus in the scientific community that "[...] the GHG [greenhouse gas] balance of perennial bioenergy crop cultivation will often be favourable [...]", also when considering the implicit direct and indirect land use changes.

=== Albedo and evapotranspiration ===
Forests generally have a low albedo because the majority of the ultraviolet and visible spectrum is absorbed through photosynthesis. For this reason, the greater heat absorption by trees could offset some of the carbon benefits of afforestation (or offset the negative climate impacts of deforestation). In other words: The climate change mitigation effect of carbon sequestration by forests is partially counterbalanced in that reforestation can decrease the reflection of sunlight (albedo).

== Environmental impacts ==
The environmental impacts of biomass production need to be taken into account. For instance, in 2022, IEA stated that "bioenergy is an important pillar of decarbonisation in the energy transition as a near zero-emission fuel", and that "more efforts are needed to accelerate modern bioenergy deployment to get on track with the Net Zero Scenario [....] while simultaneously ensuring that bioenergy production does not incur negative social and environmental consequences."

=== Sustainable forestry and forest protection ===
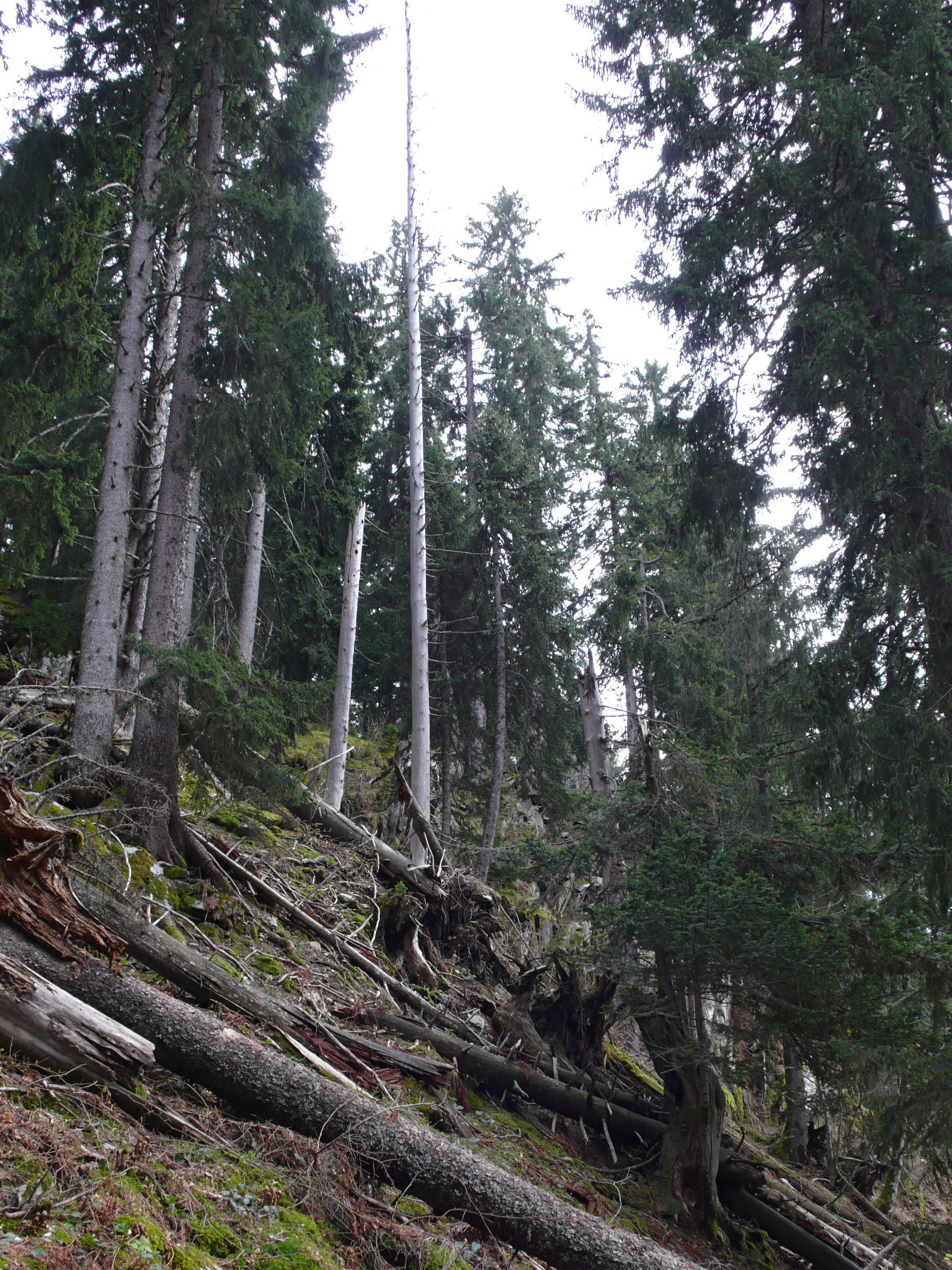
Old-growth spruce forest in France.

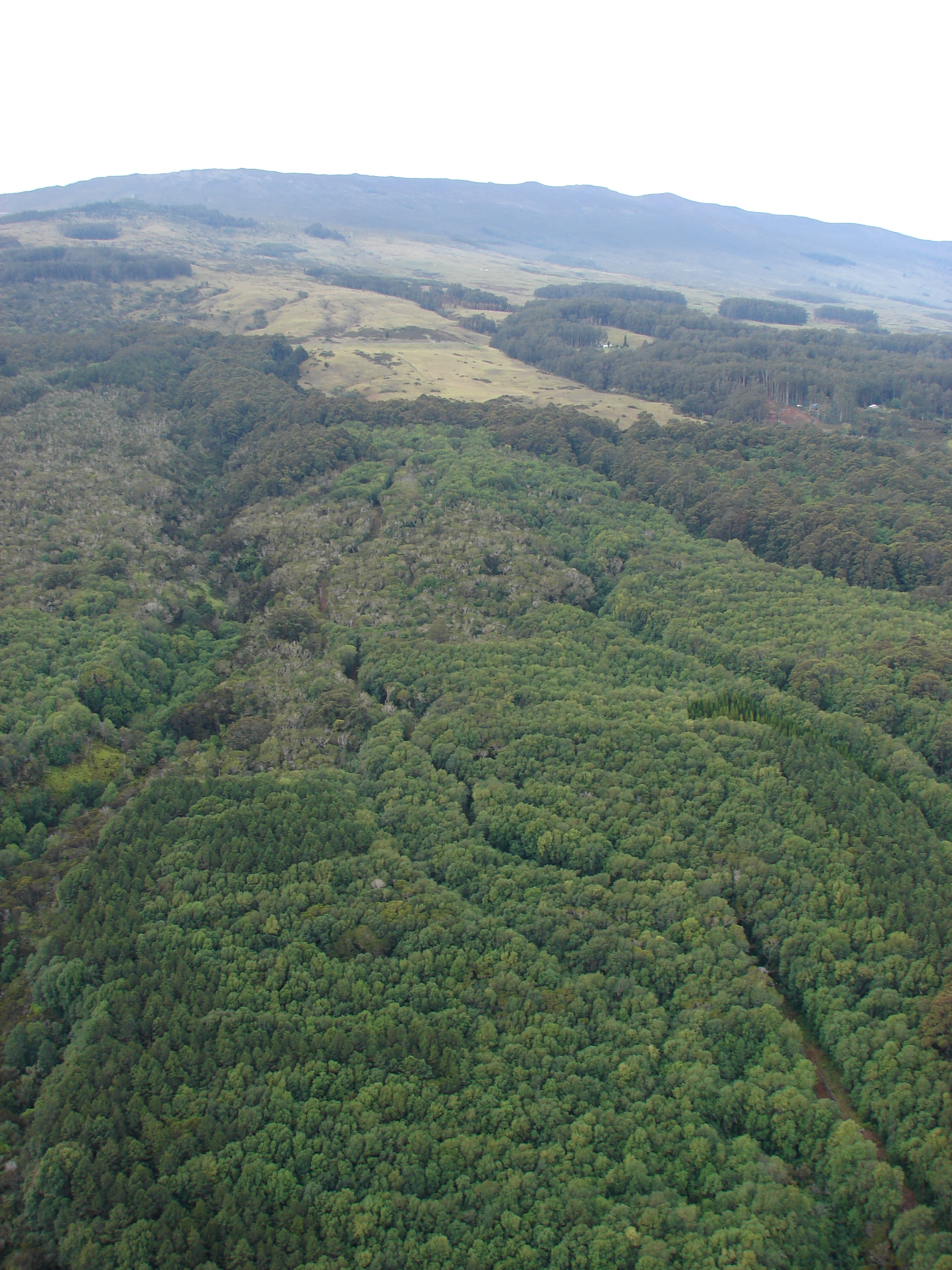
Plantation forest in Hawaii.

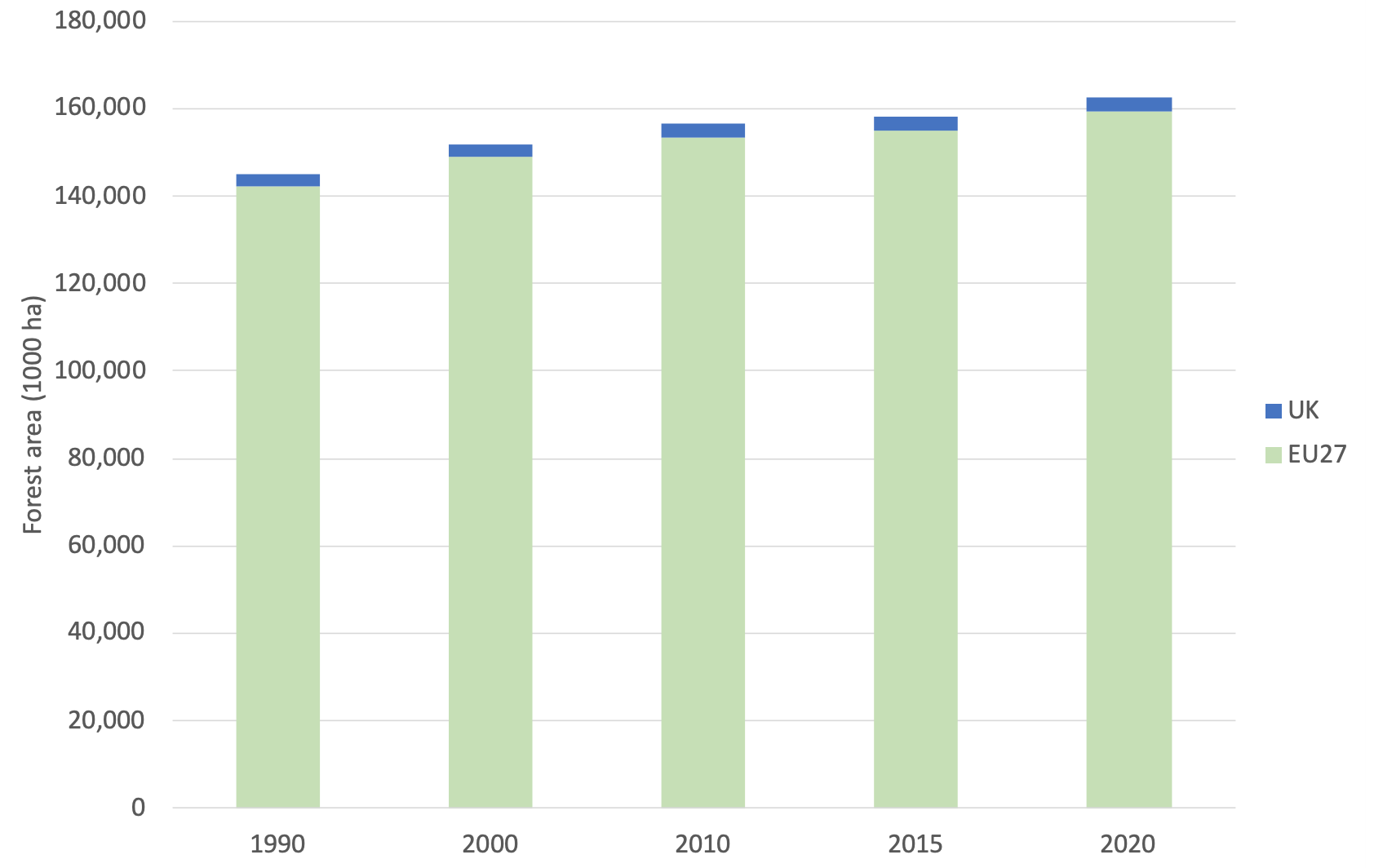
Forest area increase in the EU 1990–2020.

IPCC states that there is disagreement about whether the global forest is shrinking or not, and quote research indicating that tree cover has increased 7.1% between 1982 and 2016. The IPCC writes: "While above-ground biomass carbon stocks are estimated to be declining in the tropics, they are increasing globally due to increasing stocks in temperate and boreal forests [...]."

Old trees have a very high carbon absorption rate, and felling old trees means that this large potential for future carbon absorption is lost. There is also a loss of soil carbon due to the harvest operations.

Old trees absorb more CO_{2} than young trees because of the larger leaf area in full-grown trees. However, the old forest (as a whole) will eventually stop absorbing CO_{2} because CO_{2} emissions from dead trees cancel out the remaining living trees' CO_{2} absorption. The old forest (or forest stands) are also vulnerable for natural disturbances that produces CO_{2}. The IPCC found that "[...] landscapes with older forests have accumulated more carbon but their sink strength is diminishing, while landscapes with younger forests contain less carbon but they are removing CO_{2} from the atmosphere at a much higher rate [...]."

The IPCC states that the net climate effect from conversion of unmanaged to managed forest can be positive or negative, depending on circumstances. The carbon stock is reduced, but since managed forests grow faster than unmanaged forests, more carbon is absorbed. Positive climate effects are produced if the harvested biomass is used efficiently. There is a tradeoff between the benefits of having a maximized forest carbon stock, not absorbing any more carbon, and the benefits of having a portion of that carbon stock "unlocked", and instead working as a renewable fossil fuel replacement tool, for instance in sectors which are difficult or expensive to decarbonize.

The "competition" between locked-away and unlocked forest carbon might be won by the unlocked carbon: "In the long term, using sustainably produced forest biomass as a substitute for carbon-intensive products and fossil fuels provides greater permanent reductions in atmospheric CO_{2} than preservation does."

IEA Bioenergy writes: "forests managed for producing sawn timber, bioenergy and other wood products can make a greater contribution to climate change mitigation than forests managed for conservation alone." Three reasons are given:

1. reducing ability to act as a carbon sink when the forest matures.
2. Wood products can replace other materials that emitted more GHGs during production.
3. "Carbon in forests is vulnerable to loss through natural events such as insect infestations or wildfires"

Data from FAO show that most wood pellets are produced in regions dominated by sustainably managed forests, such as Europe and North America. Europe (including Russia) produced 54% of the world's wood pellets in 2019, and the forest carbon stock in this area increased from 158.7 to 172.4 Gt between 1990 and 2020. In the EU, above-ground forest biomass increases with 1.3% per year on average, however the increase is slowing down because the forests are maturing.

United Kingdom Emissions Trading System allows operators of CO_{2} generating installations to apply zero emissions factor for the fraction used for non-energy purposes, while energy purposes (electricity generation, heating) require additional sustainability certification on the biomass used.

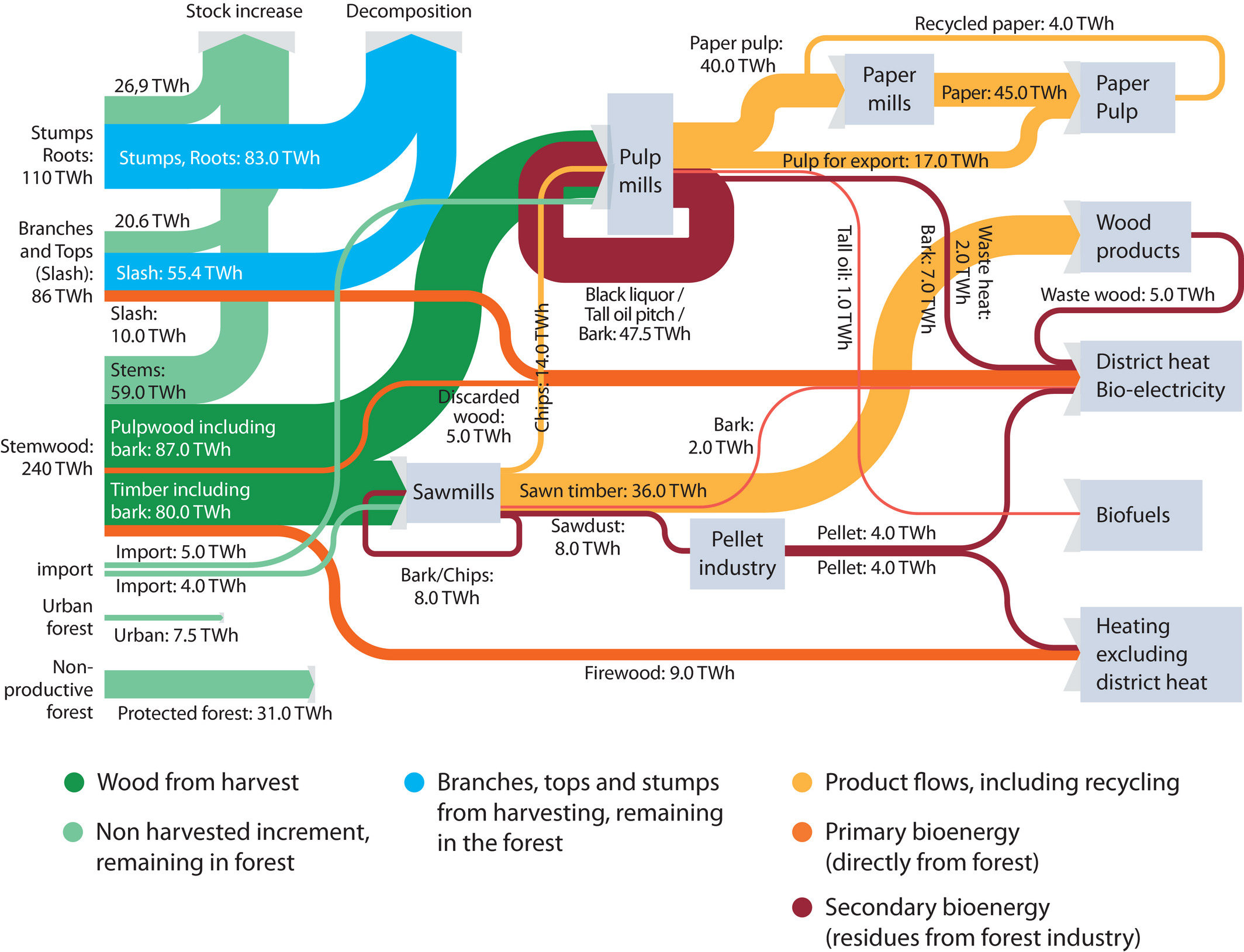
Sankey diagram that shows the flow of biomass from forest to wood products, paper and energy in Sweden.

=== Biodiversity ===
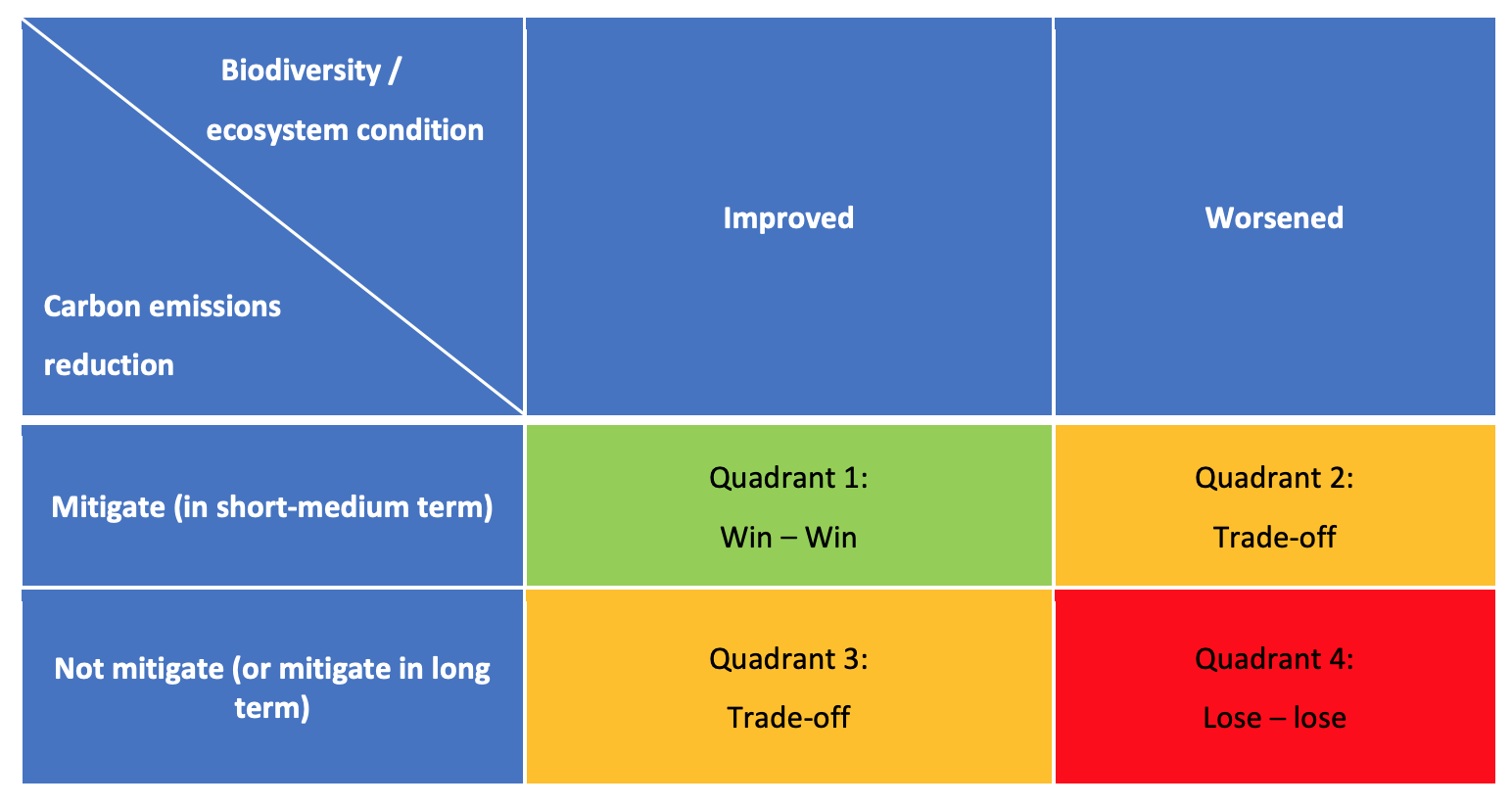
Classification scheme for win-win (green), trade-off (orange), and lose-lose (red) scenarios caused by additional bioenergy pathways in the EU.

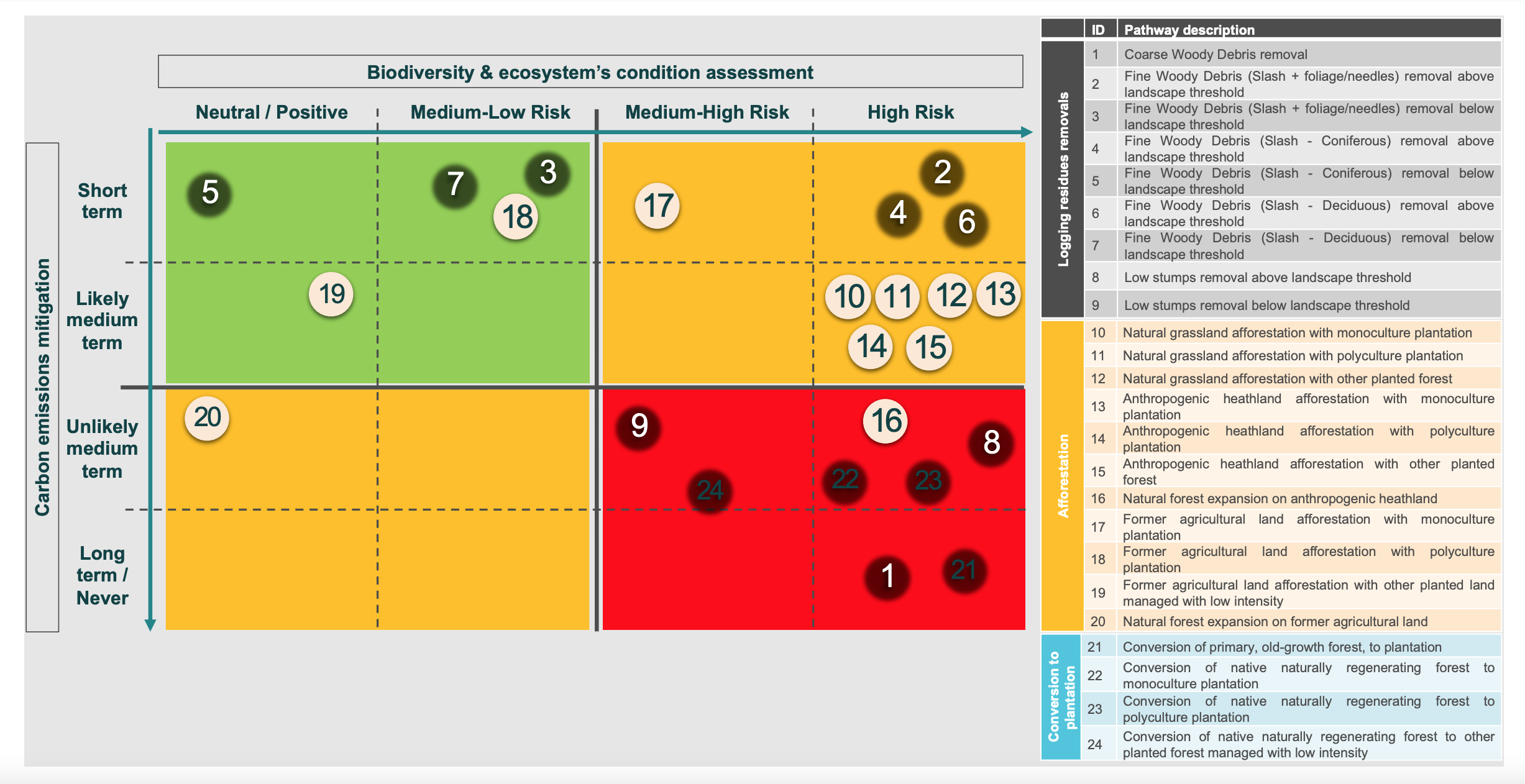
Short term climate and biodiversity impacts for 3 alternative bioenergy pathways in the EU (forest residues, afforestation and conversion to forest plantation.) Short term is here defined as a period of 0–20 years, medium term 30-50 years, and long term over 50 years.

Biomass production for bioenergy can have negative impacts on biodiversity. Oil palm and sugar cane are examples of crops that have been linked to reduced biodiversity. In addition, changes in biodiversity also impacts primary production which naturally effects decomposition and soil heterotrophic organisms.

Win-win scenarios (good for climate, good for biodiversity) include:

- Increased use of whole trees from coppice forests, increased use of thin forest residues from boreal forests with slow decay rates, and increased use of all kinds of residues from temperate forests with faster decay rates;
- Multi-functional bioenergy landscapes, instead of expansion of monoculture plantations;
- Afforestation of former agricultural land with mixed or naturally regenerating forests.

Win-lose scenarios (good for the climate, bad for biodiversity) include afforestation on ancient, biodiversity-rich grassland ecosystems which were never forests, and afforestation of former agricultural land with monoculture plantations.

Lose-win scenarios (bad for the climate, good for biodiversity) include natural forest expansion on former agricultural land.

Lose-lose scenarios include increased use of thick forest residues like stumps from some boreal forests with slow decay rates, and conversion of natural forests into forest plantations.

=== Pollution ===
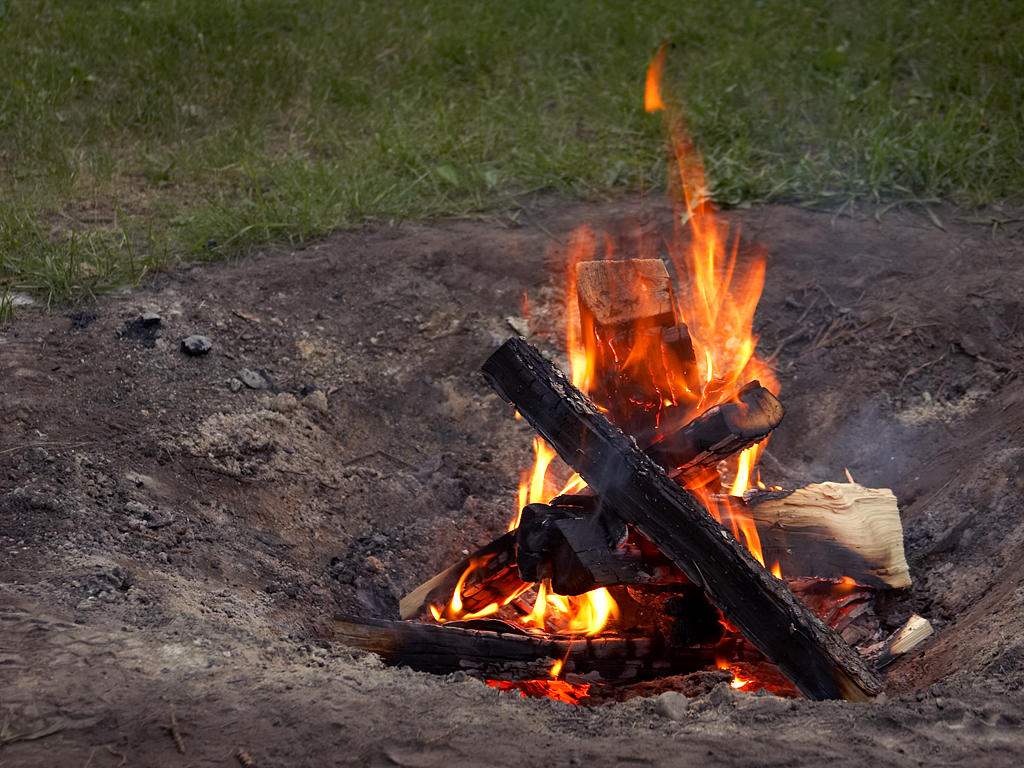
Simple traditional use of biomass for cooking or heating (combustion of wood logs).

Other problems are pollution of soil and water from fertiliser/pesticide use, and emission of ambient air pollutants, mainly from open field burning of residues.

The traditional use of wood in cook stoves and open fires produces pollutants, which can lead to severe health and environmental consequences. However, a shift to modern bioenergy contribute to improved livelihoods and can reduce land degradation and impacts on ecosystem services. According to the IPCC, there is strong evidence that modern bioenergy have "large positive impacts" on air quality. Traditional bioenergy is inefficient and the phasing out of this energy source has both large health benefits and large economic benefits. When combusted in industrial facilities, most of the pollutants originating from woody biomass reduce by 97-99%, compared to open burning. Combustion of woody biomass produces lower amounts of particulate matter than coal for the same amount of electricity generated.

== See also ==
- Bioenergetics
- Bioenergy Action Plan
- Bioenergy with carbon capture and storage
- Biomass heating system
- Biomass to liquid
- Bioproducts
- Biorefinery
- Biochar
- Cogeneration
- Carbon footprint
- Energy forestry
- Pellet fuel
- Solid fuel
- Renewable energy transition
- World Bioenergy Association
