= Bioenergy Action Plan =

On April 25, 2006, Executive Order S-06-06, the Bioenergy Action Plan was issued by the then governor of California, Arnold Schwarzenegger, outlining a set of target goals which would establish the increasing use and production of biofuels and biopower for both electricity generation and substitution of natural gas and petroleum within the state of California. The plan asked multiple state agencies (the Bioenergy Interagency Working Group) to work towards the advancement of biomass programs in California. The order would also help provide statewide environmental protection, mitigation and economic advancement. The plan was passed on July 7, 2006, with progress reports issued in 2007 and 2009.

An updated plan was released in 2011. The 2011 plan supports the goals of current California Governor Jerry Brown’s Clean Energy Jobs Plan. The 2011 plan evaluates strategies for overcoming the litigation challenges which deterred progress in the 2006 plan. The 2011 plan also recommends new actions for environmental progress in the state of California

== Types of biofuels and biomass energies ==
- Cellulosic feed stocks derived from forestry, agricultural, and urban wastes
- Gasification
- Pyrolysis
- Biomass-to-liquids conversions
- Landfill gas use in energy systems

== Goals and benefits of incorporating plan(s) ==
- Capturing methane from landfills and converting manure for overall climate benefits
- Forest and agricultural waste biomass as a source of fuel
- Combining heat (from waste biomass) for energy (electricity)
- Improving forest health and animal welfare via converting urban forestry and agricultural residues
- Enhancing rural economic development via the exportation of green fuels
- Creates local jobs (at new refinery and green plants)
- Protects watersheds and helps to avoid wildfires
- Reducing statewide petroleum dependence

== Bioenergy Interagency Working Group responsibilities ==
- Use the state and federal budgets to ease the passing of institutional, legislative and regulatory changes which are necessary for plan to be implemented.
- Carry out the state's target objectives.
- Prove the commercial readiness of production and conversion technologies for the expansion of biomass and biofuel energies.
- Develop and demonstrate projects for the biomass-fueled electricity plants and refineries.
- Help place a value and market potential on renewable sources of energy, fuel and chemicals.
- Produce and demonstrate new cropping, handling, storage, and distribution systems for renewable energy plants.
- Demonstrate efficient biomass harvesting systems at (at least) three sites.
- Communicate the benefits of bioenergy to the general public and policy makers.
- Research new sources of financing for future project development.

== 2006 Bioenergy Action Plan ==
The original plan was written based on reviews and recommendations from public workshops and more than 40 public documents, as well as multiple prior research programmes and policy developments around the world. Stakeholder considerations for California's potential as a leader in renewable energies was taken into account. The plan established a biofuel production target of California producing a minimum of 20% its own biofuels by 2010, 40% by 2020, and 75% by 2050. The production target for the use of biomass electricity was a 20% increase from the prior in-state goals for renewable generation by both 2010 and 2020.

The 2006 plan also sought the building of at least four afforestation and carbon sequestration projects, across the state, which would supply three to five megawatts of biomass-fueled electricity to an electricity gasification plant or bio-refinery. Potential sources of energy, fuel, and chemicals from forest fuel, harvest residues, and other small wood forest products were also identified, as well as the efficiency of harvesting small forest biomass. Each individual agency also had its own specific set of responsibilities towards meeting the goals of the Bioenergy Action Plan.

The 2006 Bioenergy Action Plan outlined five statewide policy objectives:

1. Maximize the contributions of bioenergy toward achieving the state's petroleum reduction, climate change, renewable energy, and environmental goals.
2. Establish California as a market leader in technology innovation, sustainable biomass development, and market development for bio-based products.
3. Coordinate research, development, demonstration, and commercialization efforts across federal and state agencies.
4. Align existing regulatory requirements to encourage production and use of California's biomass resources.
5. Facilitate market entry for new applications of bioenergy including electricity, biogas, and biofuels”.

== 2007 and 2009 progress reports ==
=== 2007 ===
- 19% of all power currently (now, i.e. 2007) comes from biomass
- Biomass power facilities are producing nearly 1,000 megawatts of electrical generating capacity
- 950 million gallons of 5.7% ethanol gasoline and over 43 million gallons of biodiesel were consumed in 2006 compared to the 14.5 billion gallons of gasoline and 4 billion gallons of convention diesel consumed
- Existing ethanol facilities only produce nearly 68 million gallons, the proposed plants could produce up to 364 million gallons per year.
- The production of biodiesel provides another 14 million gallons
- Gasoline amendments passed which favor the use of 10% ethanol blends
- 96 electricity biomass facilities have been certified and 21 facilities have gone through pre-certification
- Between 285 and 391 megawatts of new renewable electricity was added in 2006 to the electricity grid
- 33 biomass power facilities are expanded which created 640 megawatts of new renewable energy capacity
- Emission rates and standards in preference for low-carbon sources of electricity have been adopted by Senate Bill 1368
- 10 dairy digesters have been installed across California, which generate 2.5 megawatts of electrical power from dairy manure or a mixture of manure, food-wastes and wastewater
- Specialty crops (figs and barley) are being converted to energy
- New waste discharge regulations for dairies and dairy lagoons have been adopted

=== 2009 ===
- 11% of electricity consumed comes from renewable resources
- Nearly 20% of renewable electricity generated came from biomass fuels
- 943 megawatts of biopower generated
- Three idled biomass plants have resumed operations
- One idled coal facility and two working coal facilities have been converted to biomass plants
- 309 megawatts of landfill gas has been generated to electricity biopower
- 66 megawatts digester gas biopower generated
- One billion gallons of 6% ethanol consumed yet only 5.7% produced within California
- 50 million gallons of biodiesel consumed yet only 12% produced within California
- 2010 biopower and biofuel production via biomass targets are evaluated as “unlikely”
- Adopted low-carbon fuel standard for reducing greenhouse gas emissions by 10% by 2020

== 2011 Bioenergy Action Plan ==
Less than 40 actions out of the 63 initial actions from the 2006 plan were completed by the time the 2011 plan was developed/adjusted. The 2006 plan was reviewed at two public workshops on June 3, 2010, and December 14, 2010. The new version of the plan was changed accordingly to assure complete coordination with the goals targeted in California Governor Jerry Brown's Clean Energy Job Plan and the Clean Energy Future Plan. The 2011 plan extends the 20% renewable electricity production with California to 2013 instead of the 2010 goal, with a 33% renewable electricity goal by 2020. Fuel-related refineries, blenders, producers and importers are expected to reduce their carbon emissions by 10% by 2020. The production of 21 billion gallons of biofuels is projected for 2022. As with the 2006 plan, each state agency has its own individual set of goals and responsibilities.

The 2011 Bioenergy Plan objectives are outlined as:

1. Increase bioenergy production at existing facilities including restarting idling plants and repowering existing facilities.
2. Construct new bioenergy facilities.
3. Integrate bioenergy facilities with the use of multiple fuels in collection, processing, and treatment operations.
4. Commercialize conversion technologies by funding research and development.
5. Remove regulatory hurdles and streamline processes.
