= Plows, Plagues and Petroleum =

2005 book by William Ruddiman

- Author: William Ruddiman
- ISBN: 9780691173214

Plows, Plagues and Petroleum: How Humans Took Control of Climate is a 2005 book published by Princeton University Press and written by William Ruddiman, a paleoclimatologist and Professor Emeritus at the University of Virginia. He has authored and co-authored several books and academic papers on the subject of climate change. Scientists often refer to this period as the "Anthropocene" and define it as the era in which humans first began to alter the Earth's climate and ecosystems. Ruddiman contends that human induced climate change began as a result of the advent of agriculture thousands of years ago and resulted in warmer temperatures that could have possibly averted another ice age; this is the early anthropocene hypothesis.

== Synopsis ==
Ruddiman begins the book with a brief introduction to the science of climate change and the various individuals who have been key in influencing the field over the years. He also notes that the Earth's climate has been drifting toward cooler temperatures for the last 55 million years. The dominant hypothesis for this trend is that large volcanic eruptions have subsided while increasing amounts of carbon dioxide have been absorbed out of the atmosphere due to interactions between monsoon rains and ground-up rock exposed by India pushing into Asia and creating the Himalayas. Additionally, it is believed that the melting ice that produced higher sea levels resulted in the ocean absorbing more carbon dioxide out of the atmosphere. These two natural occurrences resulted in less carbon dioxide in the atmosphere hence possibly producing the general cooling trend.

According to Ruddiman, beginning about 900,000 years ago the Earth has begun to go through regular glacial cycles in which glaciers or ice have covered approximately one-quarter of the Earth's total surface. These conditions typically last for about 100,000 years and are followed by brief interglacial periods of more temperate weather. Ruddiman cites various researchers in geology and astronomy who pioneered the understanding of Earth's climate as a function of its orbit. The various cycles of Earth's climate seem to be explained by the eccentricity, axial tilt, and precession of the Earth's orbit as well as cycles in the amount of solar radiation. Ruddiman primarily relies on the groundwork by Milutin Milankovitch to explain the effects of solar radiation and Earth's orbit on the climate. By examining ice cores from around the world scientists have been able to link levels of greenhouse gases such as carbon dioxide and methane to the various cycles of Earth's climate history. The discovery of carbon dating aided a great deal in developing this understanding. Upon investigating the levels of carbon dioxide and methane in the Earth's atmosphere in the most recent interglacial period—10,000 years ago—Ruddiman noticed that levels of carbon dioxide and methane were steadily rising despite the fact that the Earth's natural cycles determined that they should have been decreasing. It was this discovery that led to Ruddiman's search for an explanation and ultimately the creation of this book.

Ruddiman's central argument is that this most recent interglacial period has deviated from the natural cycle because of human activities, most importantly farming. Approximately 10,000 years ago the ice that once covered large portions of the Northern Hemisphere began to recede and gave rise to a new way of life for early humans. In the beginning, these early humans had little impact on the environment because they were primarily hunter-gatherer societies that moved from location to location allowing previously inhabited locations to be reclaimed by nature. However, about 8,000 years ago humans first developed agriculture and a domesticated lifestyle that allowed them to continually inhabit regions and build large civilizations. Ruddiman claims that carbon dioxide emission records indicate that levels in the atmosphere began to rise at about this same time. This process was intensified as the centuries passed and new technologies such as animal husbandry and the plow made their way into more and more cultures. These new technologies allowed for more efficient methods of clearing forests and making room for increasing populations. According to previous interglacial periods, the concentration of carbon dioxide should have fallen by about 20 parts per million instead of rising by 20 parts per million. Ruddiman uses estimates of population, the forest cleared per person and carbon emitted per square kilometer cleared to approximate the total impact and concludes that the magnitude is reasonably close to the extra carbon dioxide accumulated during the period.

Ruddiman also attributes the rise of methane gas in the atmosphere to human-related activities. The most notable of these activities is the cultivation of rice in artificial wetlands in Asia and increased animal waste due to increasing populations of domesticated animals. According to Ruddiman methane concentrations should have peaked about 11,000 years ago slightly above 700 parts per billion and then declined to about 450 parts per billion today. Methane levels followed this cycle at first, but about 5000 years ago they began to rebound and currently the concentration is about 275 parts per billion above the previous trends.

According to Ruddiman farming and related activities resulted in large amounts of greenhouse gases (carbon dioxide and methane) being released into the atmosphere at a time when natural cycles of the Earth indicated they should have been falling. The result has been an unintended warming cycle that prevented the Earth from entering into another ice age. Ruddiman goes as far as to say that if these gases had not been released into the atmosphere, areas in northern Canada such as Hudson Bay and Baffin Island would currently be covered in ice today.

Throughout the record of carbon dioxide and methane emissions, there are drops and rises in the amount of concentrations present in the atmosphere. Ruddiman explains these "wiggles" by claiming that they appear at times of major outbreaks of disease such as the bubonic plague in the 1,300's and the prevalence of Old World diseases in the Americas after the arrival of Columbus. Both of these events resulted in large numbers of people dying and the land they once inhabited being reclaimed by the forest. This resulted in increased amounts of carbon dioxide being taken out of the atmosphere, hence causing global temperatures to cool down. Ruddiman claims that the Little Ice Age, starting in the 13th century and ending sometime in the early 19th century was caused by the decreased population and the re-forestation of previously cleared lands as a result of the diseases that killed off so many people.

The last aspect of Ruddiman's discussion of climate change relates to the future of petroleum use on Earth. It is commonly known that the world's supply of fossil fuels is rapidly depleting and even conservative estimates claim that the supply will not last much more than 150-200 more years. Ruddiman claims that when this source of natural fuels has been depleted, humankind will have to resort to using the large quantities of coal that still exist all over the planet. This, according to Ruddiman, will result in a continued warming trend that will only stop when technology either produces a new source of fuel or figures out a way to separate the carbon dioxide emissions prior to being released into the atmosphere. Ruddiman is quite skeptical of both scenarios in the near future because of the increased costs and technological advancements that would have to be made in such a short time. Eventually, carbon and methane emissions will be controlled and lowered a great deal and Ruddiman asserts when this happens the Earth will most likely begin an era of cooling temperatures.

== Critical assessment ==
Gavin Schmidt, a climate scientist at the NASA Goddard Institute for Space Studies in New York, described Ruddiman's ideas as intriguing, but the conclusions largely depended on a comparison of methane changes in the current warm period with those in the Vostok ice core which correlated with orbital changes, and more recent research indicated that these might not be applicable to present changes. The newer EPICA core showed only a small increase in methane during the last 5,000 years, which was generally attributed to the development of the boreal wetlands and major river deltas after the ice from the previous ice age melted and caused the sea level to rise to its current location. It was very uncertain that the relatively small human populations and cultivated areas could have made a significant difference. More research was needed to quantify relevant factors.

== See also ==
- Milankovitch cycles
- An Inconvenient Truth
- Deforestation
- Holocene
- Environmental security
- Ice caps
- Effects of global warming
- Carbon cycle
- Carbon Disclosure Project
- Guns, Germs and Steel
