= Crawford Lake =

Lake in Ontario, Canada

- Kionywarihwaen (Wyandot)
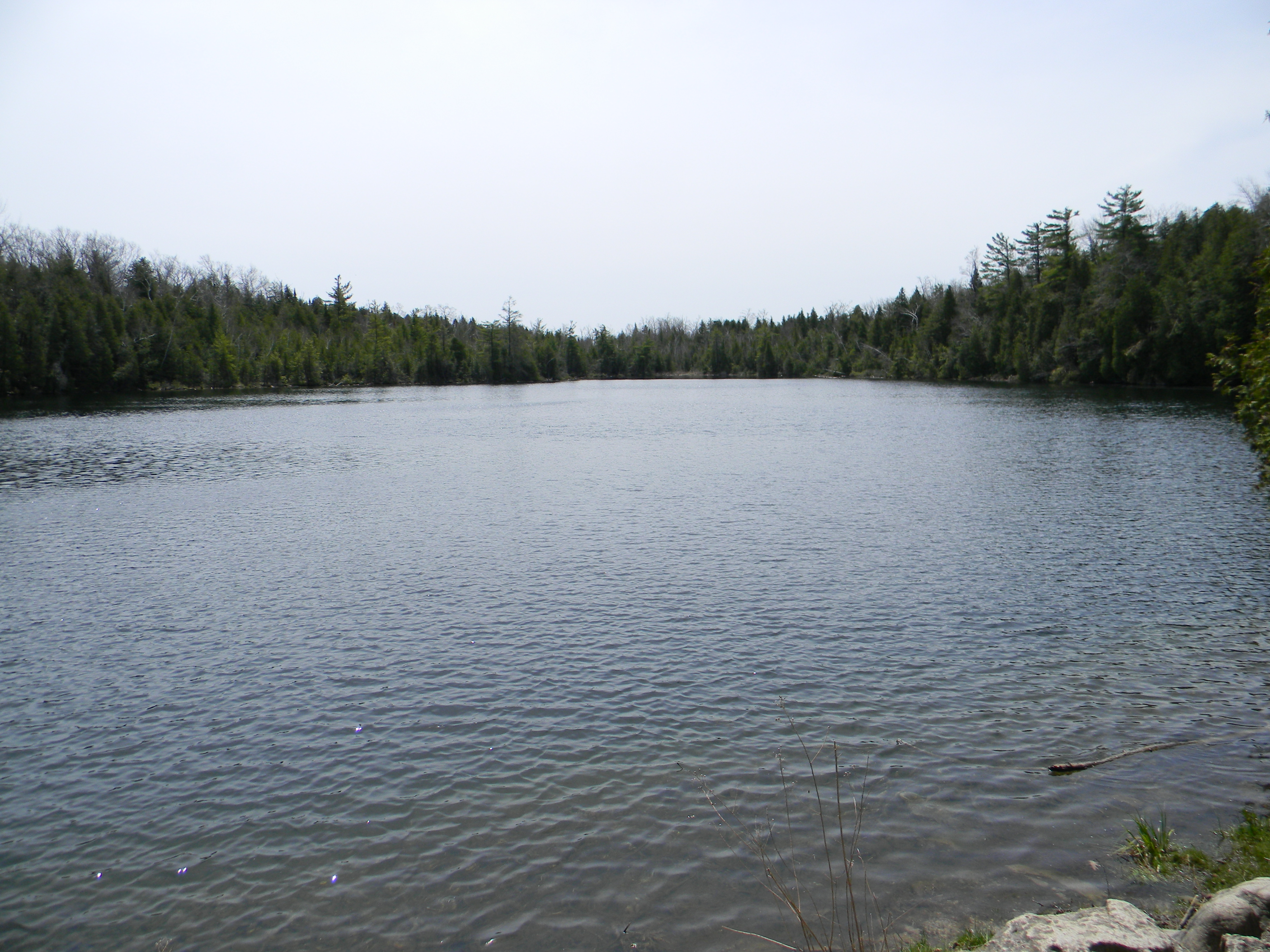

- Location in Southern Ontario
- Location: Regional Municipality of Halton, Ontario
- Coordinates: 43°28′05″N 79°56′55″W
- Type: Meromictic
- Primary inflows: Unnamed creek
- Basin countries: Canada
- Max. length: 270 m (886 ft)
- Max. width: 130 m (427 ft)
- Surface area: 2.4 ha (5.9 acres)
- Max. depth: 22.5 m (74 ft)
- Surface elevation: 286 m (938 ft)

Crawford Lake (Wyandot: Kionywarihwaen) is a lake near the community of Campbellville, in the town of Milton, Regional Municipality of Halton, Ontario, Canada. It is located within Crawford Lake Conservation Area, a Regionally Environmentally Sensitive Area, an Ontario Area of Natural and Scientific Interest, and part of the Niagara Escarpment World Biosphere Reserve.

The primary inflow to the lake is an unnamed creek.

Crawford Lake is meromictic, which means it has sequentially deposited seasonal sediment laminations called varves at the bottom; these allow for accurate dating of sediment cores and make Crawford Lake a prime site for archeological and geochemical studies.

== History ==
Using pollen analysis of the lake, reconstruction of the history of the area over several hundred years was possible. The analysis revealed the agricultural history of the native Iroquoians and a pre-European contact village, through the presence of corn and squash pollen motes. The Wendat (Huron) village has been reconstructed in the conservation area based on many years of work by archaeologists, historical references, and First Nations oral traditions.

Further analysis revealed evidence of European colonists through sawdust and ragweed pollen from the construction of nearby settlements.

The Crawfords were well known community members in the Campbellville area for their involvement with the lumber business in the village from 1882 to 1963. Throughout their years in Campbellville they ran a sawmill and lumber yard. The family also holds the namesake of nearby Crawford Lake, which was sold by Lloyd Crawford to Halton Conservation in 1969.

== Lake environment ==
Crawford Lake developed over thousands of years ago in Southern Ontario as water filled in a limestone cliff sinkhole. Due to its meromictic attributes, the lake is separated into two layers: its upper layer is mixed with external factors such as wind, and its bottom layer is undisturbed, leading to sediment accumulating at its bottom. When temperatures and acidity are high during summers, the water produces calcite that forms a white layer over the lake bed's sediment layer.

Crawford Lake is highly unusual among meromictic lakes in that, in contrast to the anoxic basin waters typical of meromictic lakes, the bottom layer (or monimolimnion) is also oxygenated.

== Ecology ==
Stratigraphic evidence using charcoal analysis of Crawford Lake's sediments showed a record of increased charcoal accumulation, when pollen analysis showed a change from northern hardwoods to a white pine and oak forest.

== Within Anthropocene ==
In 2009, the Anthropocene Working Group of the Sub-commission on Quaternary Stratigraphy began debating on a candidate for the Anthropocene Global Boundary Stratotype Section and Point (GSSP), where the area had to preserve, in good condition, changes of human impacts on the environment.

Geochemical analysis of sediment cores has allowed for the reconstruction of the environmental history (e.g. human impact, pollution) of the area. This analysis has revealed the trends and sources of air pollution over approximately 150 years. The well-distinguished stratigraphy led to the lake becoming a candidate for determining the start date of the proposed Anthropocene epoch, with a base date at 1950 CE.

In July 2023, Crawford Lake was selected by the Anthropocene Working Group as the proposed Global Boundary Stratotype Section and Point (GSSP), or "golden spike", for a formal Anthropocene Epoch. The formal proposal placed the beginning of the epoch in 1952, marked primarily by a sharp increase in plutonium from nuclear weapons testing preserved in the lake's annually deposited sediments; the corresponding stage and age was proposed to be named the "Crawfordian". In March 2024, however, the Subcommission on Quaternary Stratigraphy voted 12–4 against establishing the Anthropocene as a formal geological epoch. The decision was subsequently approved by the executive of the International Commission on Stratigraphy and upheld by the International Union of Geological Sciences, leaving the Holocene as the formally recognized current epoch. The term "Anthropocene" nevertheless continues to be widely used informally to describe the period of significant human impact on the Earth system.
