= Anthropocene Working Group =

Research group studying the Anthropocene

The Anthropocene Working Group (AWG) is an interdisciplinary research group dedicated to the study of the Anthropocene as a geological time unit. It was established in 2009 as part of the Subcommission on Quaternary Stratigraphy (SQS), a constituent body of the International Commission on Stratigraphy (ICS). As of 2021, the research group features 37 members, with the physical geographer Simon Turner as Secretary and the geologist Colin Neil Waters as chair of the group. The late Nobel Prize-winning Paul Crutzen, who popularized the word 'Anthropocene' in 2000, had also been a member of the group until he died on January 28, 2021. The main goal of the AWG is providing scientific evidence robust enough for the Anthropocene to be formally ratified by the International Union of Geological Sciences (IUGS) as an epoch within the Geologic time scale.

== History ==
Prior to the establishment of the Anthropocene Working Group in 2009, no research program dedicated to the formalization of the Anthropocene in the geologic time scale existed. The idea of naming the current epoch 'Anthropocene' rather than using its formal time unit, the Holocene, became popular after Paul Crutzen and Eugene Stoermer published in May 2000 an article on the IGBP Global Change Newsletter called "The 'Anthropocene'." Later in 2002, Crutzen published a commentary on Nature titled "Geology of Mankind" where he further stressed the idea "to assign the term ‘Anthropocene’ to the present, in many ways human-dominated, geological epoch, supplementing the Holocene," with starting date in the late 18th century (at the onset of the Industrial Revolution). Soon after Paul Crutzen published his influential articles, a debate over the beginning of the Anthropocene took place between supporters of the Early Anthropocene Hypothesis, a thesis originally promoted in 2003 by the palaeoclimatologist William Ruddiman dating the beginning of the Anthropocene as far back as the Neolithic Revolution, and supporters of more recent starting dates, from European Colonization of the Americas, to the late 18th century, to the post-WWII Great Acceleration.

The discussion over the beginning of the Anthropocene was crucial for the 'stratigraphic turn' that the Anthropocene debate took in the following years. In February 2008, Jan Zalasiewicz and other members of the Stratigraphy Commission of the Geological Society of London published a paper that considered the possibility to "amplify and extend the discussion of the effects referred to by Crutzen and then apply the same criteria used to set up new epochs to ask whether there really is justification or need for a new term, and if so, where and how its boundary might be placed." The article raised the possibility of studying the Anthropocene as a discrete geological unit—a possibility that later led to the establishment of the AWG.

In 2009, the Subcommission on Quaternary Stratigraphy established an Anthropocene Working Group to "examine the status, hierarchical level and definition of the Anthropocene as a potential new formal division of the Geological Time Scale." Some authors have labelled this moment as 'stratigraphic turn' or 'geological turn', in that the establishment of the AWG acknowledged the Anthropocene as an object of geological interest in the scientific community. The AWG has been actively publishing ever since then. The first in-person meeting of the AWG took place in October 2014 at Haus der Kulturen der Welt, Berlin (HKW), with several other work meetings at HKW to follow in subsequent years. The AWG became a close collaborator of the HKW's and Max Planck Institute for the History of Science's decade long Anthropocene Project. Within the framework of that project, HKW was able to acquired in 2018 about 850 000 Euros financial support for a systematic assessment of potential candidates for the Anthropocene's Global boundary Stratotype Section and Point (GSSP) by the AWG through means of a special appropriation from the German Bundestag. While large parts of the funding sum were dedicated to GSSP research, the AWG was obliged to contribute to HKW's Evidence & Experiment program to publicly share and discuss their research findings.

In 2020, Colin Waters, previously secretary of the AWG, became the new chair, replacing the paleobiologist Jan Zalasiewicz who had previously been chair of the AWG from 2009 to 2020, while Simon Turner became the new secretary of the group. In 2024, Jan Zalasiewicz replaced Colin Waters again as chair of the AWG, while Simon Turner remained in his role as secretary of the working group.

In 2023, the AWG submitted a proposal to define the Anthropocene epoch on the International Chronostratigraphic Chart, starting from 1952 CE based on the high levels of Plutonium as a marker.

In 2024, academics from the International Commission on Stratigraphy (ICS) voted on a proporsal to formally define the Anthropocene as a new epoch. The proposal was rejected by a 12 to 4 vote in March.

== Research ==
The Anthropocene Working Group is one of four workings groups part of the Subcommission on Quaternary Stratigraphy (the other three being the Pleistocene–Holocene boundary working group, Middle/Late Pleistocene boundary working group, and Early/Middle Pleistocene boundary working group). The AWG members (including Paul Crutzen, who was awarded the Nobel prize for chemistry in 1995 for his researcher on ozone depletion; John McNeill, a pioneering researcher in the field of environmental history; and Naomi Oreskes, author of the book Merchants of Doubt) have diverse disciplinary backgrounds, ranging from international law, archaeology, and history to philosophy, natural science, and geography. Since no direct funding supports the research program, communication among members happens mostly through email, whereas meetings are usually founded by hosting institutions.

As for most of the epochs in the Phanerozoic (the current Eon, starting 539 million years ago), determining the beginning of the Anthropocene by locating and agreeing upon its lower boundary is a necessary step in its process of formal recognition as a geochronological/chronostratigraphic unit. A lower boundary is defined by locating a GSSP (informally known as 'golden spike') in the stratigraphic section of a stage, the chronostratigraphic taxonomic equivalent of an epoch. Alternatively, if a 'golden spike' cannot be located, a GSSA can be agreed upon, although this methodology is usually implemented for Precambrian boundaries. There is a specific set of rules that a GSSP must fulfill in order to be recognized as a valid primary geologic marker.

A central object of research for the AWG is establishing when, where, and how to locate the lower boundary of the Anthropocene. This means assigning a starting date to the Anthropocene (and an end to the Holocene), locating primary as well as auxiliary markers defining Anthropocene geologic record, and determining the proper methodology to implement in the overall process of formalization (GSSP or GSSA, what proxies to use as markers, etc.). Although debates on the taxonomical level of the Anthropocene in the chronostratigraphic chart / geologic time scale (Stage/Age, Series/Epoch, or System/Period) have occurred, the AWG has been considering the Anthropocene to best fit the requirements to be taxonomically recognized as an epoch.

In January 2014, the Geological Society of London published A Stratigraphical Basis for the Anthropocene, a collection of scientific essays dedicated to assessing and analyzing the anthropogenic signatures defining the Anthropocene, and its requirements to be recognized as a distinct chronostratigraphic unit from the Holocene. The volume constitutes a landmark publication for the AWG, collecting a preliminary body of scientific evidence for the Anthropocene, and establishing research areas and trajectories retraced in the following years.

In February 2019, the AWG published The Anthropocene as a Geological Time Unit: A Guide to the Scientific Evidence and Current Debate. It represents an extensive summary of evidence collected supporting the case of formalization of the Anthropocene as a geological time unit. The synthesis comprehends evidence ranging from stratigraphy, lithostratigraphy, mineralogy, biostratigraphy, chemostratigraphy, to climatology, Earth system science, and archaeology. The monograph also links the Anthropocene to the question concerning anthropogenic climate change, and the role of human technology and the technosphere in impacting the functioning of the Earth system. In the first chapter, the authors also provide a genealogy of the term 'Anthropocene,' and a statement of the role of the AWG as a scientific research program.

In May, 2019, the AWG completed a binding vote determining two major research questions:

- "Should the Anthropocene be treated as a formal chrono-stratigraphic unit defined by a GSSP?"
- "Should the primary guide for the base of the Anthropocene be one of the stratigraphic signals around the mid-twentieth century of the Common Era?"

Both questions received a positive response, with 29 votes in favor, 4 votes against, and no abstention (33 votes received out of 34 potential voting members).

On July 11, 2023, the AWG proposed Crawford Lake, Canada as GSSP candidate site of the Anthropocene series in a joint press conference with the Max Planck Society.

== Media ==
In 2016 seven prominent members of the AWG – Erle Ellis, John McNeill, Eric Odada, Andrew Revkin, Will Steffen, Davor Vidas and Jan Zalasiewicz – were interviewed in the feature documentary Anthropocene which showed on campuses and at film festivals worldwide and helped the term gain public attention. The documentary was the first feature-length film about the new epoch, and was described by Earth.com as one of the top ten documentaries to help raise environmental awareness. While the seven AWG members formed a broad consensus about the Anthropocene's history and the term's significance, they took contrasting views when invited by director Steve Bradshaw to consider the Anthropocene either as a tragedy – with extinctions and upheavals – or as a dark comedy.

== See also ==
- Research program
- Geochronology
- Chronostratigraphy
- List of GSSPs
- History of geology
- Attribution of recent climate change
- Human ecology
