= Early anthropocene =

Hypothesis of climate impact by early humans

The Early Anthropocene Hypothesis (sometimes referred to as 'Early Anthropogenic' or 'Ruddiman Hypothesis') is a stance concerning the beginning of the Anthropocene first proposed by William Ruddiman in 2003. It posits that the Anthropocene, a proposed geological epoch coinciding with the most recent period in Earth's history when the activities of the human race first began to have a significant global impact on Earth's climate and ecosystems, dates back to 8,000 years ago, triggered by intense farming activities after agriculture became widespread. It was at that time that atmospheric greenhouse gas concentrations stopped following the periodic pattern of rises and falls that had accurately characterized their past long-term behavior, a pattern that is explained by natural variations in Earth's orbit known as Milankovitch cycles. Ruddiman's proposed start-date has been met with criticism from scholars in a variety of fields.

The Early Anthropocene Hypothesis asserts that the Anthropocene did not begin during European colonization of the Americas, as numerous scholars posit, nor the eighteenth century with advent of coal-burning factories and power plants of the industrial era, as originally argued by Paul Crutzen (who popularized the word 'Anthropocene' in 2000), nor in the 1950s as claimed by the Anthropocene Working Group (a geological research program working on the Anthropocene as a geological time unit).

== Overdue-glaciation hypothesis ==
In his overdue-glaciation hypothesis, Ruddiman claims that an incipient ice age would have begun several thousand years ago, but that scheduled ice age was forestalled by intense farming and deforestation by early farmers that began raising the level of greenhouse gases eight thousand years ago.

The overdue-glaciation hypothesis has been challenged on the grounds that comparison with an earlier interglaciation (MIS 11, 400,000 years ago) suggest that 16,000 more years must elapse before the current Holocene interglaciation comes to an end. Data from even earlier ice-cores going as far back as 800,000 years ago suggest probable cyclicity of interglacial length and an inverse correlation with the maximum temperature of each interglacial, but Ruddiman argues that this results from a false alignment of recent insolation maxima with insolation minima from the past, among other irregularities that invalidate the criticism.

== Neolithic Revolution ==
The Neolithic Revolution, or agricultural revolution, was a wide-scale demographic transition in the Neolithic. Historically verifiable, many human cultures changed from hunter-gatherers to agriculture and settlement that supported an increase in population. Archaeological data indicates that various forms of plants and animal domestication evolved in separate locations worldwide, starting in the geological epoch of the Holocene around 12,000 ^{14}C years ago (12,000–7,000 BP).

== Criticism ==
A group of geographers led by Jan Zalasiewicz and Will Steffen argued that the Neolithic Revolution does not show the wide-scale environmental change necessary for epochal designation that other starting points, such as the Anthropocene Working Group's 1950 marker, does.

In contrast, a 2025 review by environmental historian Jeremy Davies argued that the Anthropocene should still be formally recognized as a distinct epoch, emphasizing that Earth-system changes since the mid-twentieth century mark a clear departure from Holocene conditions.

Other criticism of the Early Anthropocene Hypothesis stems from its representation of American Indian societies. Humanities scholar Elizabeth DeLoughrey has posited that while the Early Anthropocene Hypothesis "traces out an eight-thousand-year history of deforestation," it "never contextualizes the histories of human violence. Consequently, in explaining those eras in which CO2 did not rise due to a significant drop in the production of agriculture caused by death, [Ruddiman] likens the plague in Medieval Europe to the decimation of 90 percent of the Indigenous peoples of the Americas, referring to it simply as a 'pandemic' rather than genocide. Accordingly, the unprecedented drop in CO2 levels from 1550 to 1800—due to a population collapse of more than fifty million people with causal links to colonization, slavery, war, displacement, containment, and outright ethnic cleansing—is attributed to smallpox."

Environmental scholars have also argued that while the Early Anthropocene Hypothesis accounts for land change and rising greenhouse gas production resulting from changing farming practices in Europe and Asia during the Neolithic revolution, it does not account for relational agriculture practiced in the Americas during the same period. Once Native American agriculture is studied alongside the Early Anthropocene Hypothesis, it becomes clear that such land change and greenhouse gas emissions take place in the Americas only after European colonization. Thus, colonialism should be seen as the main driver of environmental change responsible for the Anthropocene rather than agriculture.

Scholars have also disputed Ruddiman's claim that the land change and greenhouse gas emissions caused by Neolithic farming practices account for a large enough systems change to denote new epochal designation. These scholars claim that an early date for the proposed Anthropocene term does not account for a substantial human footprint on Earth. Others have argued that the Early Anthropocene Hypothesis only provides a cursory view of Native American farming practices prior to European colonization, which did not result in the same land change or greenhouse gas emissions as European and Asian agriculture of the same period. They argue that if precolonial Native American farming was studied in relation to European and Asian agriculture of the same period, the European colonization of the Americas would be seen as the epoch's starting point.
