= Deliang Chen =

Chinese-Swedish climatologist

- 陈德亮
- Born: July 21, 1961 (age 65); Taizhou, Jiangsu, China
- Education: Nanjing University; Johannes Gutenberg University Mainz; University of Cologne
- Scientific career
- Fields: Climatology
- Workplaces: Royal Swedish Academy of Sciences
- Thesis: Development of a Two-Dimensional Model of Global Climate-Transport (1992)
- Doctoral advisor: Paul J. Crutzen

Deliang Chen (simplified Chinese: 陈德亮; traditional Chinese: 陳德亮; pinyin: Chén Déliàng; born 21 July 1961) is a Chinese-Swedish climatologist who is August Röhss Chair of the Department of Earth Sciences of University of Gothenburg. He is a fellow of the Royal Swedish Academy of Sciences, and a foreign academician of the Chinese Academy of Sciences and of the Royal Norwegian Society of Sciences and Letters.

== Biography ==
Chen was born in Hailing District of Taizhou, Jiangsu, on July 21, 1961. He attended the Dongfanghong School. In 1979, after resuming his college entrance examination, he entered Nanjing University, majoring in climatology. After college, he was assigned to the Institute of Geographic Sciences and Natural Resources Research, Chinese Academy of Sciences as an assistant research fellow. Chen arrived in Germany in 1988 at the age of 27 to begin his education at Johannes Gutenberg University Mainz in Mainz, Rhineland-Palatinate, where he studied geoscience under Paul J. Crutzen. In 1992 he did post-doctoral research at the University of Cologne.

He has been teaching at the University of Gothenburg since 1993, where he was promoted to Associate Professor in 1996 and to full Professor in 2000. He chaired the department of physiography from January 2000 to December 2002. He was director of International Council for Science (ICSU) between 2009 and 2012.

In 2010 Chen was elected a fellow of the Royal Swedish Academy of Sciences. He became a foreign academician of the Chinese Academy of Sciences on November 28, 2017.

In 2018 he was appointed chairman of the Department of Geography of the Royal Swedish Academy of Sciences. That same year, he was elected a Foreign Academician of the Royal Norwegian Society of Sciences and Letters.

He has directed 26 doctoral dissertations, including Gerrit Lohmann, Lars Lindkvist, Katarina Borne, Barbro Johansson, Maj-Lena Linderson, Cecilia Hellström, Christine Achberger, Fredrik Wetterhall, Lijun Fan, Junfeng Miao, Yanling Song, Elisabeth Simelton, Shuiqing Yin, Lin Tang, Cecilia Bennet, Matilda Palm, Eriksson, Ge Gao, Jenny Sundberg, Ida Westerberg, Sihong Wu, Lars Zetterberg, Yaomin Liao, Alexander Walther, Tinghai Ou and Peng Zhang.
