= Eugene F. Stoermer =

Eugene Filmore Stoermer
- Born: 7 March 1934; United States
- Died: 17 February 2012 (aged 77); United States
- Education: Iowa State University
- Known for: diatoms study Anthropocene term
- Scientific career
- Fields: Botany and Ecology

Eugene F. Stoermer (March 7, 1934 – February 17, 2012) was a leading researcher in diatoms, with a special emphasis on freshwater species of the North American Great Lakes. He was a professor of biology at the University of Michigan School of Natural Resources and Environment.

== Biography ==
His Bachelor of Science degree was obtained in 1958 and his Doctor of Biological Science in 1963, both from Iowa State University. His doctoral thesis was "Post-pleistocene diatoms from Lake West Okoboji, Iowa"

Stoermer originally coined and used the term Anthropocene from the early 1980s to refer to the impact and evidence for the effects of human activity on the planet earth. The word was not used in general culture until it was popularized in 2000 by Nobel Prize-winning atmospheric chemist Paul Crutzen and others who regard the influence of human behavior on Earth's atmosphere in recent centuries as so significant as to constitute a new geological epoch.

He is the co-author with J. P. Smol of The Diatoms Applications for the Environmental and Earth Sciences. Cambridge, UK: Cambridge University Press, 1999. ISBN 0511155069; According to WorldCat, the book is held in 1262 libraries

In 2009, he received the honor of a festschrift, Diatom taxonomy, ultrastructure, and ecology : modern methods and timeless questions : a tribute to Eugene F. Stoermer

== Named after him ==
Diatom genera — Stoermeria J.P. Kociolek, L. Escobar & S. Richardon, 1996.

Diatom species:

- Amphora stoermerii M. Edlund & Z. Levkov, 2009
- Amphorotia stoermeri D.M. Williams & G. Reid, 2006
- Colliculoamphora stoermeri G. Reid & D.M. Williams, 2009
- Encyonema stoermeri S.A. Spaulding, J.R. Pool & S.I. Castro, 2010
- Encyonopsis stoermeri H. Lange-Bertalot & D. Metzeltin, 2009
- Frustulia stoermeri H. Lange-Bertalot & D. Metzeltin, 2009
- Gomphonema stoermeri J.P. Kociolek & J.C. Kingston, 1999
- Gomphosphenia stoermeri J.P. Kociolek & E.W. Thomas, 2009
- Navicula stoermeri J.P. Kociolek & B. de Reviers, 1996
- Neidium stoermeri E.W. Thomas & J.P. Kociolek, 2008
- Pinnularia stoermeri D. Metzeltin & H. Lange-Bertalot, 2007
- Surirella stoermerii R.L. Lowe, 1973
