= Anthropocene =

Proposed geologic epoch

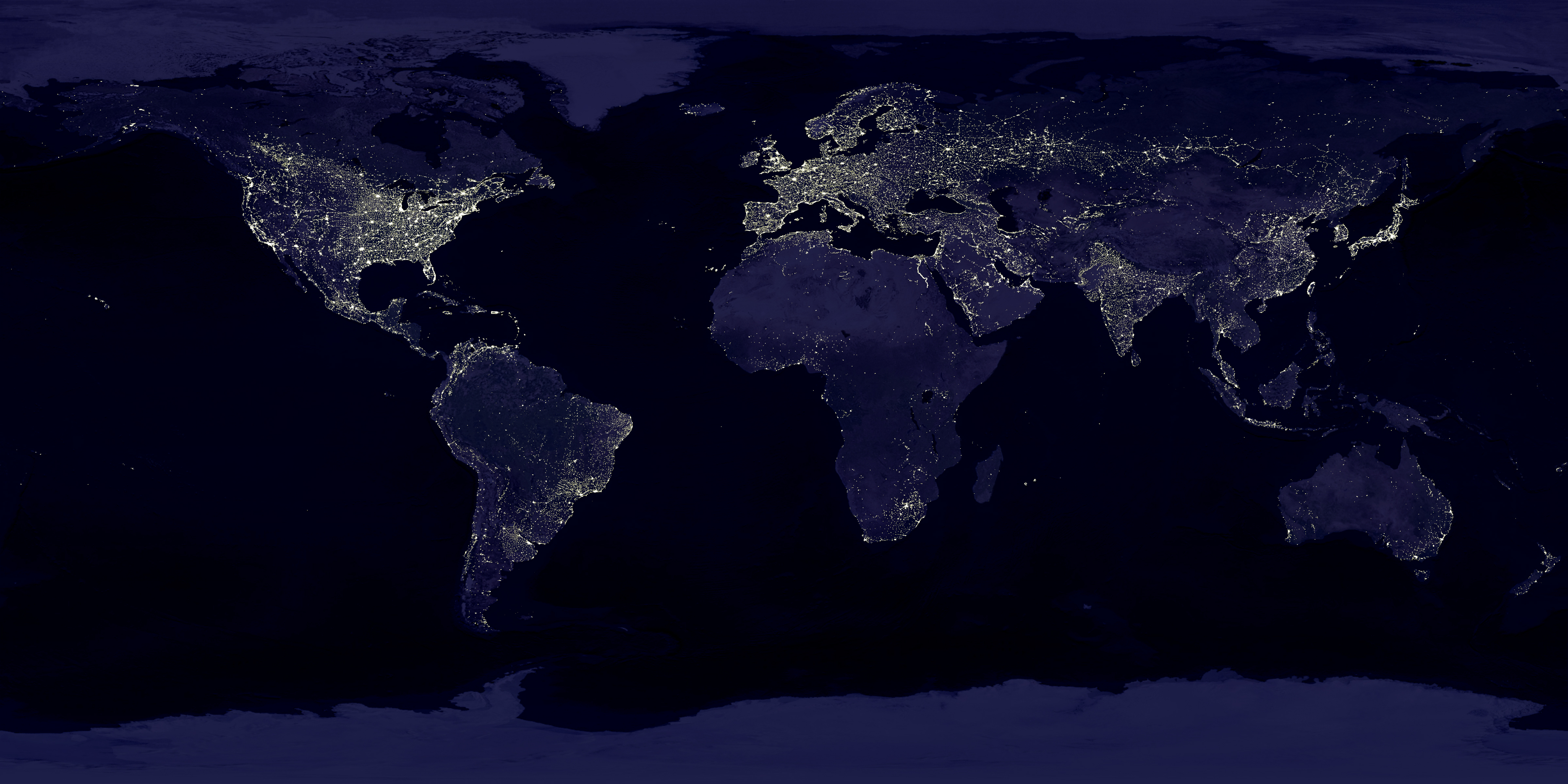
- The electric lights of human population centers are visible from low Earth orbit, demonstrating how technology has impacted the environment on a global scale.

Chronology
← / Y2K; ← / Great Acceleration; ← / Unix time
Subdivision of the Anthropocene according to the Anthropocene Working Group, as of 2024. Vertical axis scale: Gregorian years (Common Era)

Usage information
- Celestial body: Earth
- Regional usage: Proposed but rejected subdivision of the Quaternary Period
- Time scale(s) used: ICS Time Scale

Definition
- Chronological unit: Epoch
- Stratigraphic unit: Series
- First proposed by: Anthropocene Working Group
- Lower boundary definition: Spike in levels of plutonium from hydrogen bomb tests (1952)
- Lower boundary GSSP: Crawford Lake, Ontario, Canada; 43°28′05″N 79°56′55″W
- Upper boundary definition: Present day
- Upper boundary GSSP: N/A; N/A
- Upper GSSP ratified: N/A

Anthropocene is a term that has been used to refer to the period of time during which humanity has become a planetary force of change. It appears in scientific social discourse, especially with respect to accelerating geophysical and biochemical changes that characterize the 20th and 21st centuries on Earth. Originally a proposal for a new geological epoch following the Holocene, it was rejected as such in 2024 by the International Commission on Stratigraphy (ICS) and the International Union of Geological Sciences (IUGS).

The term has been used in sophisticated research relating to Earth's water and salt, geology, geomorphology, landscape, limnology, hydrology, ecosystems and climate. The effects of human activities on Earth can be seen, for example, in regards to biodiversity loss, and climate change. Various start dates for the Anthropocene have been proposed, ranging from the beginning of the Neolithic Revolution (12,000–15,000 years ago), to as recently as the 1960s. The biologist Eugene F. Stoermer is credited with first coining and using the term anthropocene informally in the 1980s; Paul J. Crutzen re-invented and popularized the term.

The Anthropocene Working Group (AWG) of the Subcommission on Quaternary Stratigraphy (SQS) of the ICS voted in 2016 to proceed towards a formal golden spike (GSSP) proposal to define an Anthropocene epoch in the geologic time scale. Later that year, the group presented the proposal to the International Geological Congress.

In 2019, the AWG voted in favour of submitting a formal proposal to the ICS by 2021. The proposal located potential stratigraphic markers to the mid-20th century, a post-World War II time period during which global population growth, economic growth, pollution and exploitation of natural resources have all increased at a dramatic rate. The Atomic Age also started around the mid-20th century, when the risks of nuclear wars, nuclear terrorism, and nuclear accidents increased.

Twelve candidate sites were selected for the GSSP; the sediments of Crawford Lake (Halton Region), Canada were finally proposed, in 2023, to mark the lower boundary of the Anthropocene, starting with the Crawfordian stage/age in 1950.

In 2024, after 15 years of deliberation, the Anthropocene Epoch proposal of the AWG was voted down by a wide margin by the SQS, owing largely to its shallow sedimentary record and extremely recent proposed start date. The ICS and the IUGS later formally confirmed, by a near unanimous vote, the rejection of the AWG's Anthropocene Epoch proposal for inclusion in the Geologic Time Scale. The IUGS statement on the rejection concluded: "Despite its rejection as a formal unit of the Geologic Time Scale, Anthropocene will nevertheless continue to be used not only by Earth and environmental scientists, but also by social scientists, politicians and economists, as well as by the public at large. It will remain an invaluable descriptor of human impact on the Earth system."

== Development of the concept ==
As early as 1873, the Italian geologist Antonio Stoppani acknowledged the increasing power and effect of humanity on the Earth's systems and referred to an 'anthropozoic era'. From 1877 onward, the term 'Psychozoic' was used by geologists such as Joseph LeConte and Johannes Herman Frederik Umbgrove.

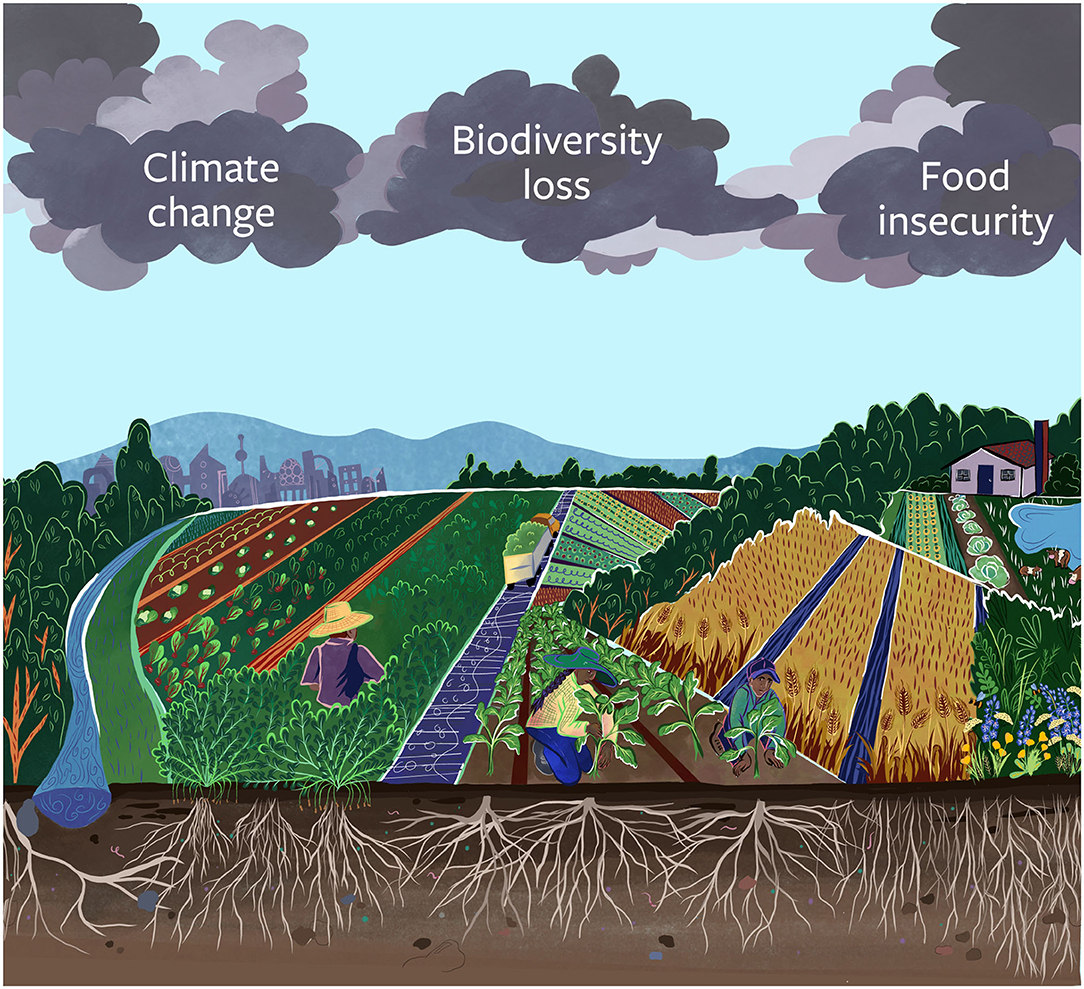
The Anthropocene is characterized by human impacts on their environment, with ramifications for variables such as climate change, biodiversity loss, and global food insecurity.

An early concept for the Anthropocene was the Noosphere by Vladimir Vernadsky, who in 1938 wrote of "scientific thought as a geological force". Scientists in the Soviet Union appear to have used the term Anthropocene as early as the 1960s to refer to the Quaternary, the most recent geological period. Ecologist Eugene F. Stoermer subsequently used Anthropocene with a different sense in the 1980s and the term was widely popularised in 2000 by atmospheric chemist Paul J. Crutzen, who regarded the influence of human behavior on Earth's atmosphere in recent centuries as so significant as to constitute a new geological epoch.

The pressures we exert on the planet have become so great that scientists are considering whether the Earth has entered an entirely new geological epoch: the Anthropocene, or the age of humans. It means that we are the first people to live in an age defined by human choice, in which the dominant risk to our survival is ourselves.

— Achim Steiner, UNDP Administrator

The term Anthropocene is informally used in scientific contexts. The Geological Society of America entitled its 2011 annual meeting: Archean to Anthropocene: The past is the key to the future. The new epoch has no agreed start-date, but one proposal, based on atmospheric evidence, is to fix the start with the Industrial Revolution c.1780, with the invention of the steam engine. Other scientists link the new term to earlier events, such as the rise of agriculture and the Neolithic Revolution (around 12,000 years BP).

Evidence of relative human impact – such as the growing human influence on land use, ecosystems, biodiversity, and species extinction – is substantial; scientists think that human impact has significantly changed (or halted) the growth of biodiversity. Those arguing for earlier dates posit that the proposed Anthropocene may have begun as early as 14,000–15,000 years BP, based on geologic evidence; this has led other scientists to suggest that "the onset of the Anthropocene should be extended back many thousand years"; this would make the Anthropocene essentially synonymous with the current term, Holocene.

=== Anthropocene Working Group ===
In 2008, the Stratigraphy Commission of the Geological Society of London considered a proposal to make the Anthropocene a formal unit of geological epoch divisions. A majority of the commission decided the proposal had merit and should be examined further. Independent working groups of scientists from various geological societies began to determine whether the Anthropocene will be formally accepted into the Geological Time Scale.

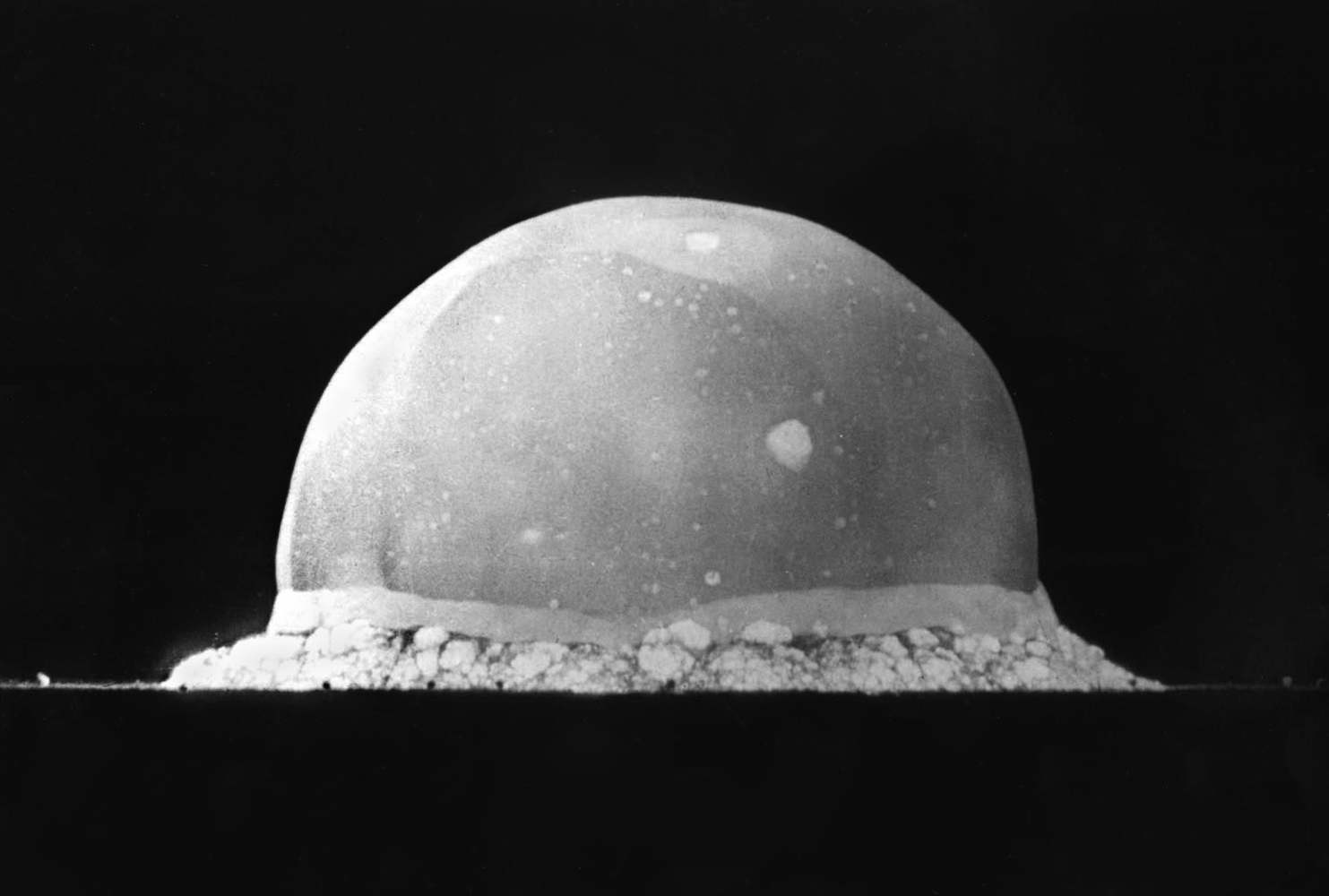
The Trinity test in July 1945 has been proposed as the start of the Anthropocene.

In January 2015, 26 of the 38 members of the International Anthropocene Working Group published a paper suggesting the Trinity test on 16 July 1945 as the starting point of the proposed new epoch. However, a significant minority supported one of several alternative dates. A March 2015 report suggested either 1610 or 1964 as the beginning of the Anthropocene. Other scholars pointed to the diachronous character of the physical strata of the Anthropocene, arguing that onset and impact are spread out over time, not reducible to a single instant or date of start.

A January 2016 report on the climatic, biological, and geochemical signatures of human activity in sediments and ice cores suggested the era since the mid-20th century should be recognised as a geological epoch distinct from the Holocene.

The Anthropocene Working Group met in April 2016 to consolidate evidence supporting the argument for the Anthropocene as a true geologic epoch. Evidence was evaluated and the group voted to recommend Anthropocene as the new geological epoch in August 2016.

In April 2019, the Anthropocene Working Group (AWG) announced that they would vote on a formal proposal to the International Commission on Stratigraphy, to continue the process started at the 2016 meeting. In May 2019, 29 members of the 34 person AWG panel voted in favour of an official proposal to be made by 2021. The AWG also voted with 29 votes in favour of a starting date in the mid 20th century. Ten candidate sites for a Global boundary Stratotype Section and Point have been identified, one of which will be chosen to be included in the final proposal. Possible markers include microplastics, heavy metals, or radioactive nuclei left by tests from thermonuclear weapons.

In November 2021, an alternative proposal that the Anthropocene is a geological event, not an epoch, was published and later expanded in 2022. This challenged the assumption underlying the case for the Anthropocene epoch – the idea that it is possible to accurately assign a precise date of start to highly diachronous processes of human-influenced Earth system change. The argument indicated that finding a single GSSP would be impractical, given human-induced changes in the Earth system occurred at different periods, in different places, and spread under different rates. Under this model, the Anthropocene would have many events marking human-induced impacts on the planet, including the mass extinction of large vertebrates, the development of early farming, land clearance in the Americas, global-scale industrial transformation during the Industrial Revolution, and the start of the Atomic Age. The authors are members of the AWG who had voted against the official proposal of a starting date in the mid-20th century, and sought to reconcile some of the previous models (including Ruddiman and Maslin proposals). They cited Crutzen's original concept, arguing that the Anthropocene is much better and more usefully conceived of as an unfolding geological event, like other major transformations in Earth's history such as the Great Oxidation Event.

In July 2023, the AWG chose Crawford Lake in Ontario, Canada as a site representing the beginning of the proposed new epoch. The sediment in that lake shows a spike in levels of plutonium from hydrogen bomb tests, a key marker the group chose to place the start of the Anthropocene in the 1950s, along with other elevated markers including carbon particles and nitrates from the burning of fossil fuels and widespread application of chemical fertilizers respectively. Had it been approved, the official declaration of the new Anthropocene epoch would have taken place in August 2024, and its first age may have been named Crawfordian after the lake.

=== Rejection in 2024 vote by IUGS ===
In March 2024, an internal vote was held by the IUGS: After nearly 15 years of debate, the proposal to ratify the Anthropocene was defeated by a 12-to-4 margin, with 2 abstentions. This result was not out of a dismissal of human impact on the planet, but rather an inability to constrain the Anthropocene in a geological context. This is because the widely-adopted 1950 start date was found to be prone to recency bias. It also overshadowed earlier examples of human impacts, many of which happened in different parts of the world at different times. Although the proposal could be raised again, this would require the entire process of debate to start from the beginning. The results of the vote were officially confirmed by the IUGS and upheld as definitive later that month.

== Proposed starting point ==
=== Industrial Revolution ===
Crutzen proposed the Industrial Revolution as the start of Anthropocene. Lovelock proposed that the Anthropocene began with the first application of the Newcomen steam engine in 1712. The Intergovernmental Panel on Climate Change takes the pre-industrial era (chosen as the year 1750) as the baseline related to changes in long-lived, well mixed greenhouse gases. Although it is apparent that the Industrial Revolution ushered in an unprecedented global human impact on the planet, much of Earth's landscape already had been profoundly modified by human activities. The human impact on Earth has grown progressively, with few substantial slowdowns. A 2024 scientific perspective paper authored by a group of scientists led by William J. Ripple proposed the start of the Anthropocene around 1850, stating it is a "compelling choice ... from a population, fossil fuel, greenhouse gases, temperature, and land use perspective."

=== Mid-20th century (Great Acceleration) ===
In May 2019 the twenty-nine members of the Anthropocene Working Group (AWG) proposed a start date for the Epoch in the mid-20th century, as that period saw "a rapidly rising human population accelerated the pace of industrial production, the use of agricultural chemicals and other human activities. At the same time, the first atomic-bomb blasts littered the globe with radioactive debris that became embedded in sediments and glacial ice, becoming part of the geologic record." The official start-dates, according to the panel, would coincide with either the radionuclides released into the atmosphere from bomb detonations in 1945, or with the Limited Nuclear Test Ban Treaty of 1963.

=== First atomic bomb (1945) ===
The peak in radionuclides fallout consequential to atomic bomb testing during the 1950s is another possible date for the beginning of the Anthropocene (the detonation of the first atomic bomb in 1945 or the Partial Nuclear Test Ban Treaty in 1963).

=== Minimum atmospheric methane concentration ===
On 19 June 2025, Vincent Gauci proposed that Anthropocene began in 1592. Ice core records had shown a minimum atmospheric methane concentration at that time.

=== Start of the Holocene ===
Some researchers have proposed that the Anthropocene started at roughly the same time as the Holocene. This proposal is based on evidence that prehistoric peoples made lasting and significant alterations to their environments as soon as they settled new lands around the world. The impacts include habitat changes, deforestation, hunting megafauna to extinction, and introducing invasive species – all of which had permanent impacts in many of the environments where humans lived. Many of these initial modifications to the environment occurred around 15,000 to 5,000 years ago, gradually as humans spread across the world. This has led some researchers to propose that the Holocene and Anthropocene are coeval.

== Etymology ==
The name Anthropocene is a combination of anthropo- from the Ancient Greek ἄνθρωπος (ánthropos) meaning 'human' and -cene from καινός (kainós) meaning 'new' or 'recent'.

== Nature of human effects ==
=== Biodiversity loss ===
The human impact on biodiversity forms one of the primary attributes of the Anthropocene. Humankind has entered what is sometimes called the Earth's sixth major extinction. Most experts agree that human activities have accelerated the rate of species extinction. The exact rate remains controversial – perhaps 100 to 1000 times the normal background rate of extinction.

Anthropogenic extinctions started as humans migrated out of Africa over 60,000 years ago. Increases in global rates of extinction have been elevated above background rates since at least 1500, and appear to have accelerated in the 19th century and further since. Rapid economic growth is considered a primary driver of the contemporary displacement and eradication of other species.

According to the 2021 Economics of Biodiversity review, written by Partha Dasgupta and published by the UK government, "biodiversity is declining faster than at any time in human history." A 2022 scientific review published in Biological Reviews confirms that an anthropogenic sixth mass extinction event is currently underway. A 2022 study published in Frontiers in Ecology and the Environment, which surveyed more than 3,000 experts, states that the extinction crisis could be worse than previously thought, and estimates that roughly 30% of species "have been globally threatened or driven extinct since the year 1500." According to a 2023 study published in Biological Reviews some 48% of 70,000 monitored species are experiencing population declines from human activity, whereas only 3% have increasing populations.

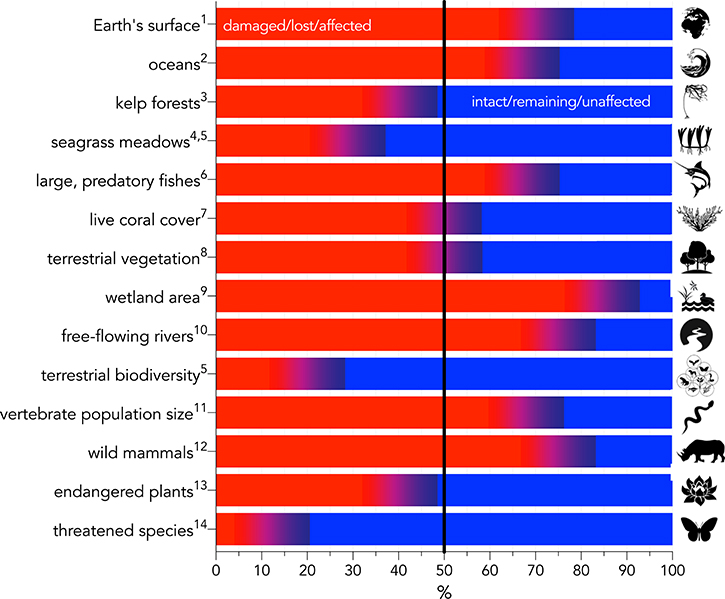
Summary of major environmental-change categories that cause biodiversity loss. The data is expressed as a percentage of human-driven change (in red) relative to baseline (blue), as of 2021. Red indicates the percentage of the category that is damaged, lost, or otherwise affected, whereas blue indicates the percentage that is intact, remaining, or otherwise unaffected.

Biodiversity loss happens when species disappear completely from Earth (extinction) or when there is a decrease or disappearance of species in a specific area. Biodiversity loss means that there is a reduction in biological diversity in a given area. The decrease can be temporary or permanent. It is temporary if the damage that led to the loss is reversible in time, for example through ecological restoration.If this is not possible, then the decrease is permanent. The cause of most of the biodiversity loss is, generally speaking, human activities that push the planetary boundaries too far. These activities include habitat destruction (for example deforestation) and land use intensification (for example monoculture farming). Further problem areas are air and water pollution (including nutrient pollution), over-exploitation, invasive species and climate change.

Many scientists, along with the Global Assessment Report on Biodiversity and Ecosystem Services, say that the main reason for biodiversity loss is a growing human population because this leads to human overpopulation and excessive consumption. Others disagree, saying that loss of habitat is caused mainly by "the growth of commodities for export" and that population has little to do with overall consumption. More important are wealth disparities between and within countries. In any case, all contemporary biodiversity loss has been attributed to human activities.

Climate change is another threat to global biodiversity. For example, coral reefs—which are biodiversity hotspots—will be lost by the year 2100 if global warming continues at the current rate. Additionally, the change of temperatures are likely to increase fire activity driving events such as forest fires. Still, it is the general habitat destruction (often for expansion of agriculture), not climate change, that is currently the bigger driver of biodiversity loss. Invasive species and other disturbances have become more common in forests in the last several decades. These tend to be directly or indirectly connected to climate change and can cause a deterioration of forest ecosystems.

=== Biogeography and nocturnality ===
Studies of urban evolution give an indication of how species may respond to stressors such as temperature change and toxicity. Species display varying abilities to respond to altered environments through both phenotypic plasticity and genetic evolution. Researchers have documented the movement of many species into regions formerly too cold for them, often at rates faster than initially expected.

Permanent changes in the distribution of organisms from human influence will become identifiable in the geologic record. This has occurred in part as a result of changing climate, but also in response to farming and fishing, and to the accidental introduction of non-native species to new areas through global travel. The ecosystem of the entire Black Sea may have changed during the last 2000 years as a result of nutrient and silica input from eroding deforested lands along the Danube River.

Researchers have found that the growth of the human population and expansion of human activity has resulted in many species of animals that are normally active during the day, such as elephants, tigers and boars, becoming nocturnal to avoid contact with humans, who are largely diurnal.

=== Climate change ===
One geological symptom resulting from human activity is increasing atmospheric carbon dioxide (CO_{2}) content. This signal in the Earth's climate system is especially significant because it is occurring much faster, and to a greater extent, than previously. Most of this increase is due to the combustion of fossil fuels such as coal, oil, and gas.

Atmospheric CO_{2} concentration measured at Mauna Loa Observatory in Hawaii from 1958 to 2023 (also called the Keeling Curve). The rise in CO_{2} over that time period is clearly visible. The concentration is expressed as μmole per mole, or ppm.

In the atmosphere of Earth, carbon dioxide (CO_{2}) is a trace gas that plays an integral part in the greenhouse effect, carbon cycle, photosynthesis, and oceanic carbon cycle. It is one of three main greenhouse gases in the atmosphere of Earth. In 2026, the concentration of carbon dioxide in the atmosphere reached 432 ppm or 0.0432% (on a molar basis), representing a mass of 3380 gigatonnes. This is an increase of 54% since the start of the Industrial Revolution, up from 280 ppm during the 10,000 years prior to the mid-18th century. The increase is due to human activity.

Effects of climate change are well documented and growing for Earth's natural environment and human societies. Changes to the climate system include an overall warming trend, changes to precipitation patterns, and more extreme weather. As the climate changes it impacts the natural environment with effects such as more intense forest fires, thawing permafrost, and desertification. These changes impact ecosystems and societies, and can become irreversible once tipping points are crossed. Climate activists are engaged in a range of activities around the world that seek to ameliorate these issues or prevent them from happening.

The effects of climate change vary in timing and location. Up until now the Arctic has warmed faster than most other regions due to climate change feedbacks. Surface air temperatures over land have also increased at about twice the rate they do over the ocean, causing intense heat waves. These temperatures would stabilize if greenhouse gas emissions were brought under control. Ice sheets and oceans absorb the vast majority of excess heat in the atmosphere, delaying effects there but causing them to accelerate and then continue after surface temperatures stabilize. Sea level rise is a particular long term concern as a result. The effects of ocean warming also include marine heatwaves, ocean stratification, deoxygenation, and changes to ocean currents. The ocean is also acidifying as it absorbs carbon dioxide from the atmosphere.

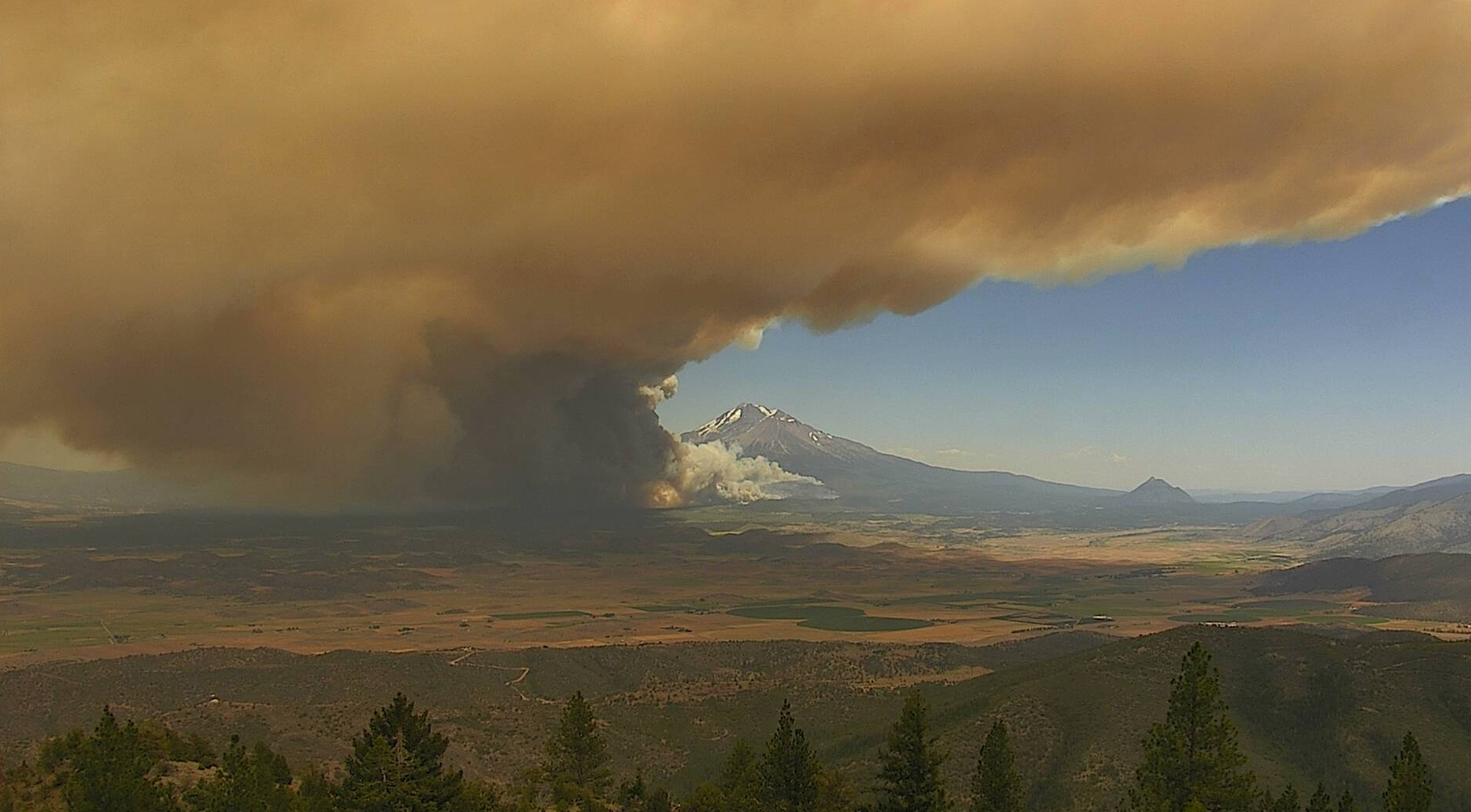
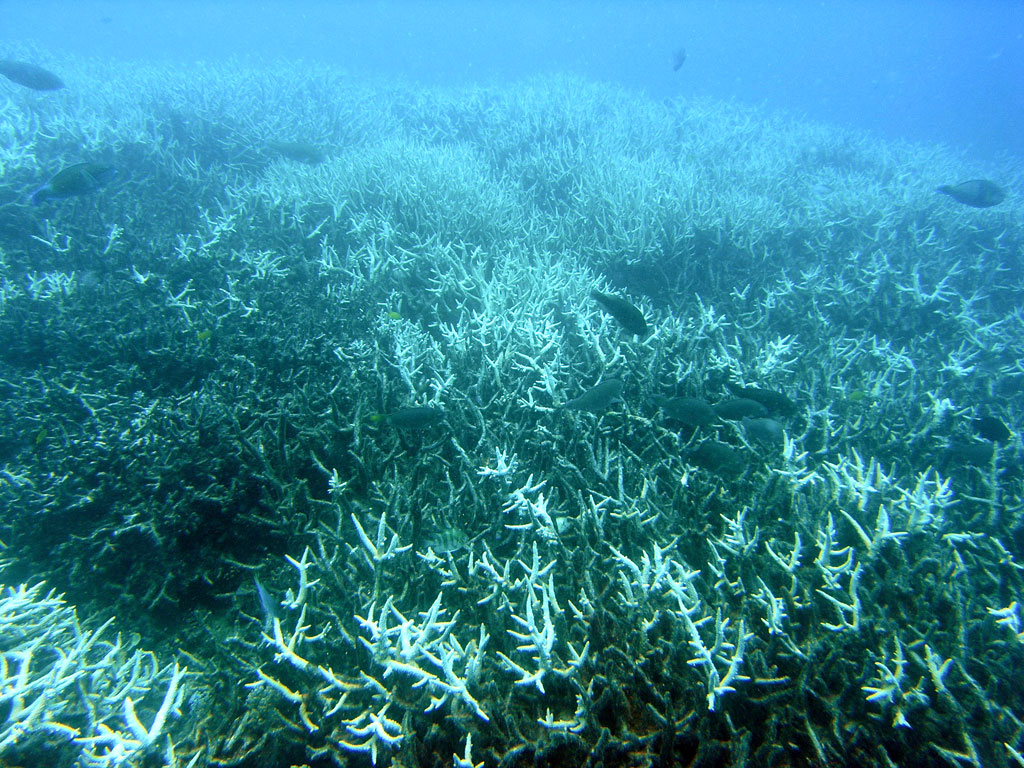
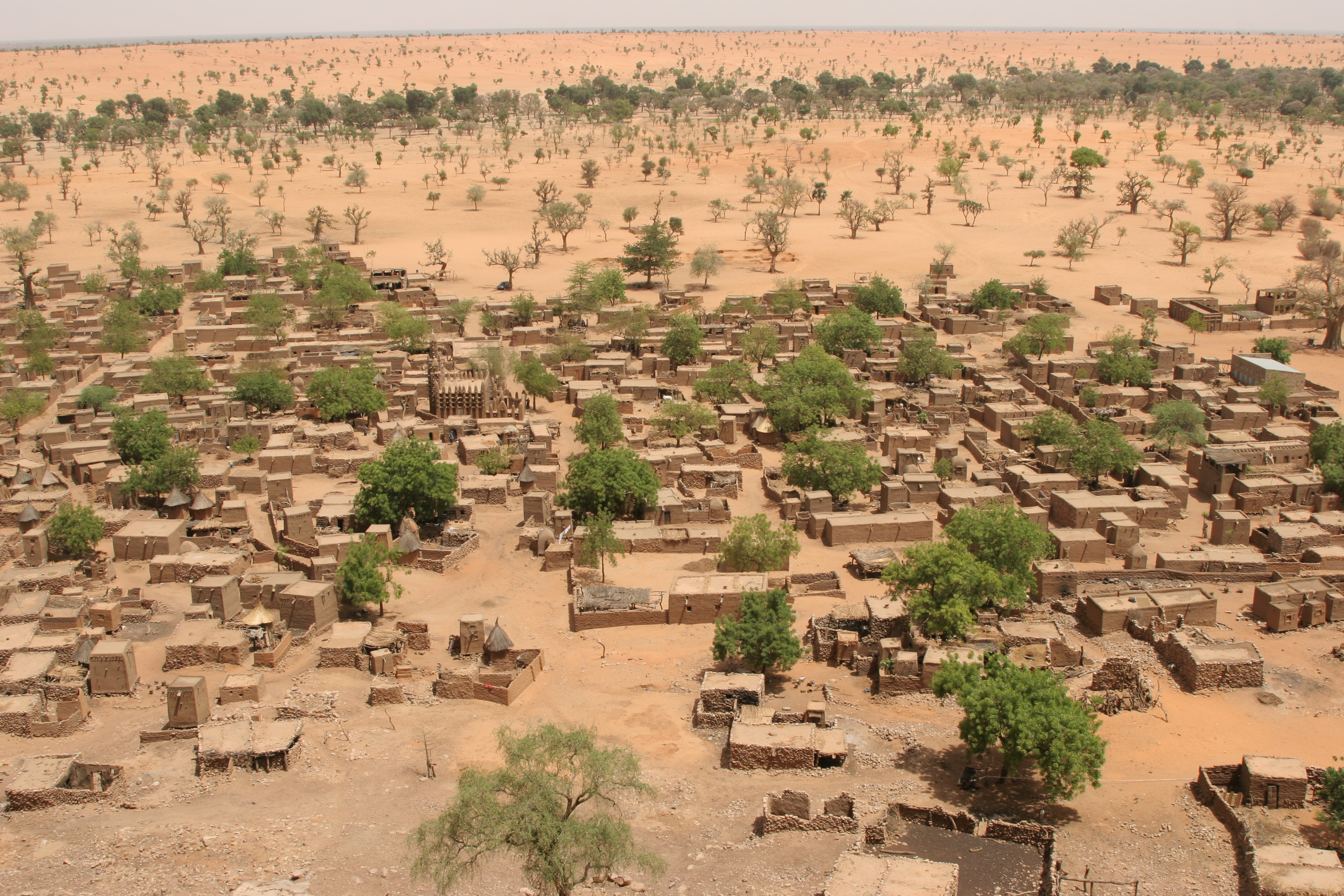
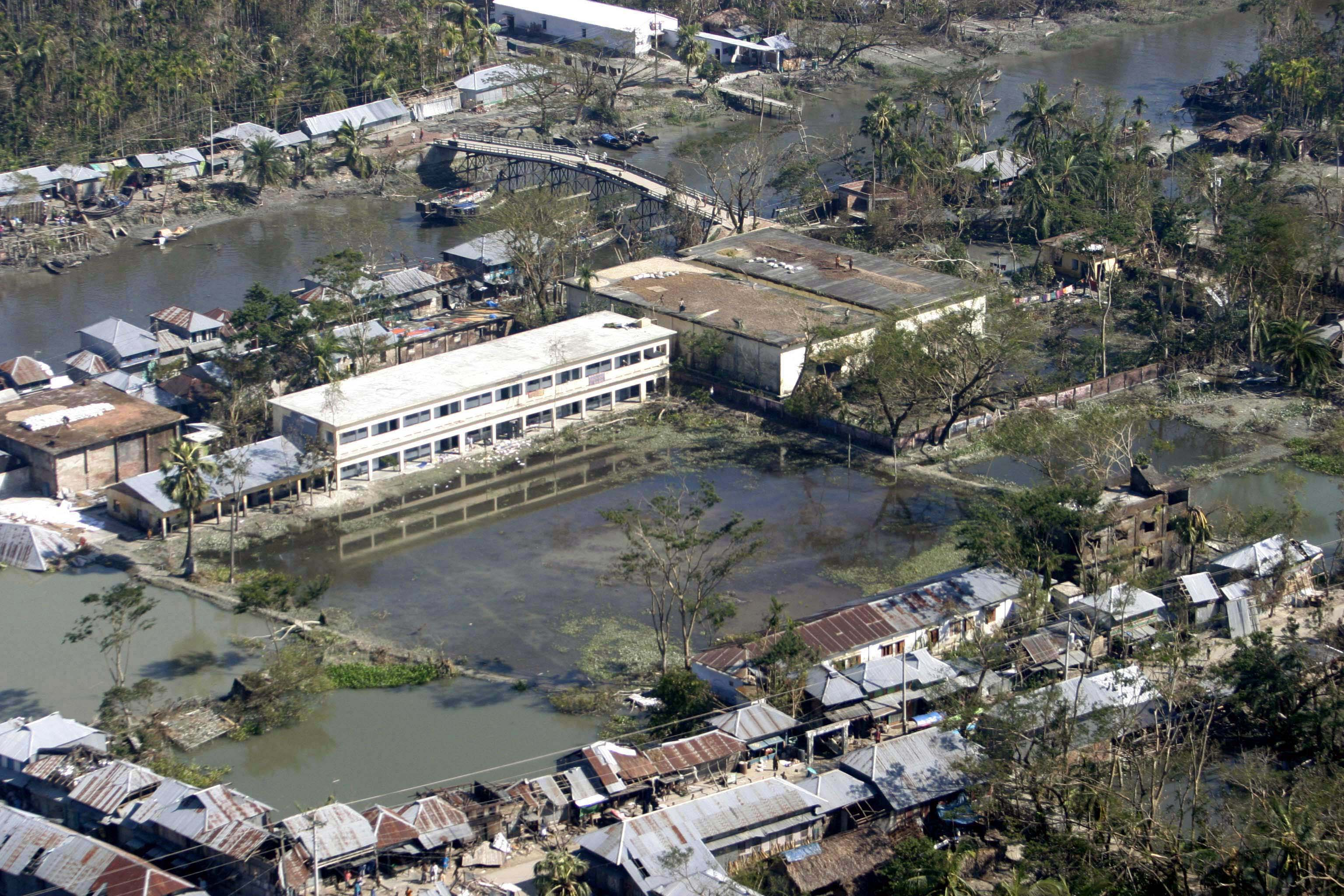
Some climate change effects: wildfire caused by heat and dryness, bleached coral caused by ocean acidification and heating, environmental migration caused by desertification, and coastal flooding caused by storms and sea level rise.

=== Geomorphology ===
Changes in drainage patterns traceable to human activity will persist over geologic time in large parts of the continents where the geologic regime is erosional. This involves, for example, the paths of roads and highways defined by their grading and drainage control. Direct changes to the form of the Earth's surface by human activities (quarrying and landscaping, for example) also record human impacts.

It has been suggested that the deposition of calthemite formations exemplify a natural process which has not previously occurred prior to the human modification of the Earth's surface, and which therefore represents a unique process of the Anthropocene. Calthemite is a secondary deposit, derived from concrete, lime, mortar or other calcareous material outside the cave environment. Calthemites grow on or under man-made structures (including mines and tunnels) and mimic the shapes and forms of cave speleothems, such as stalactites, stalagmites, flowstone etc.

=== Stratigraphy ===
==== Sedimentological record ====
Human activities, including deforestation and road construction, are believed to have elevated average total sediment fluxes across the Earth's surface. However, construction of dams on many rivers around the world means the rates of sediment deposition in any given place do not always appear to increase in the Anthropocene. For instance, many river deltas around the world are actually currently starved of sediment by such dams, and are subsiding and failing to keep up with sea level rise, rather than growing.

==== Fossil record ====
Increases in erosion due to farming and other operations will be reflected by changes in sediment composition and increases in deposition rates elsewhere. In land areas with a depositional regime, engineered structures will tend to be buried and preserved, along with litter and debris. Litter and debris thrown from boats or carried by rivers and creeks will accumulate in the marine environment, particularly in coastal areas, but also in mid-ocean garbage patches. Such human-created artifacts preserved in stratigraphy are known as technofossils.

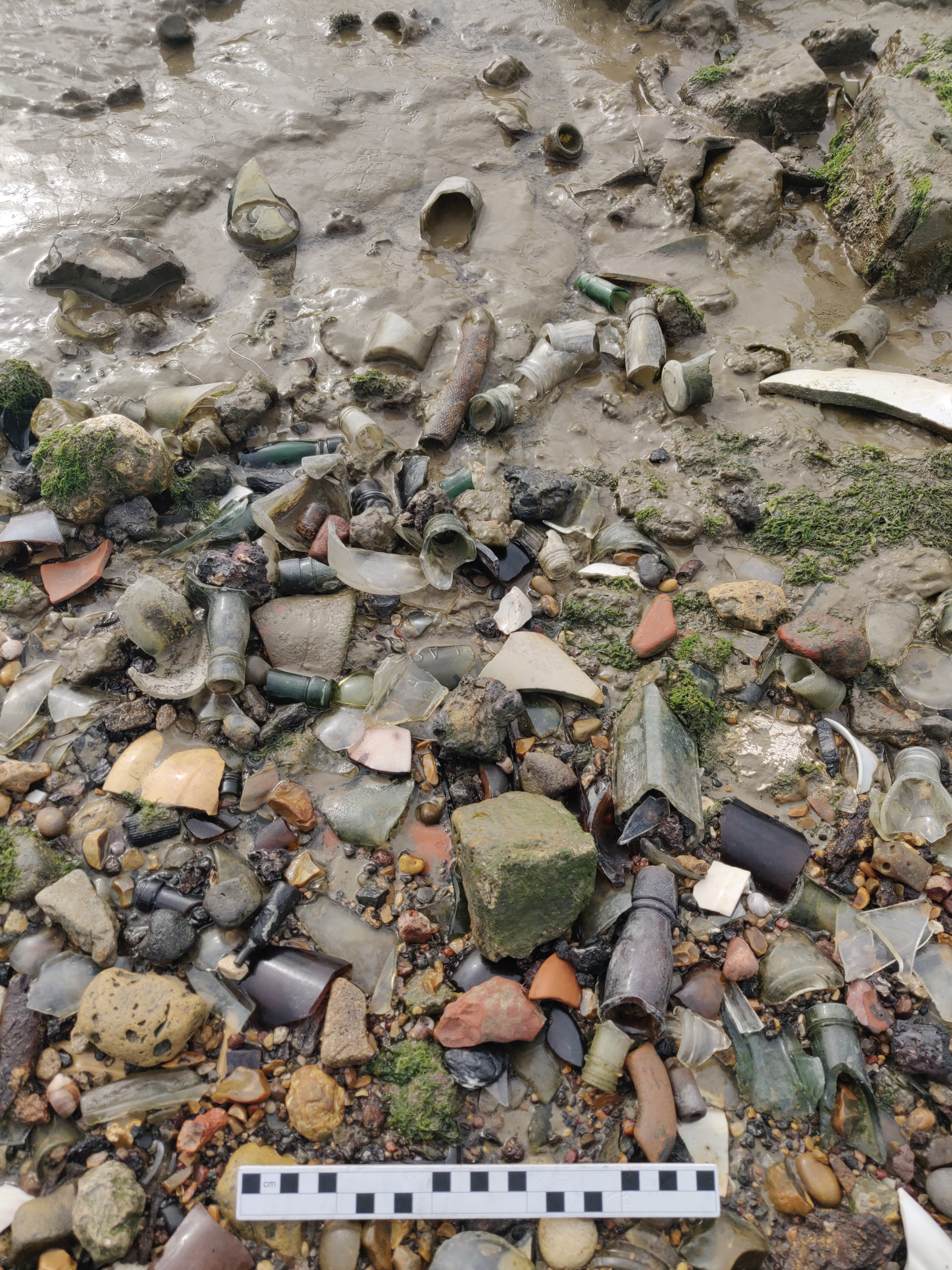
Twentieth-century technofossils in inundated landfill deposits at East Tilbury on the River Thames estuary

Changes in biodiversity will also be reflected in the fossil record, as will species introductions. An example cited is the domestic chicken, originally the red junglefowl Gallus gallus, native to south-east Asia but has since become the world's most common bird through human breeding and consumption, with over 60 billion consumed annually and whose bones would become fossilised in landfill sites. Hence, landfills are important resources to find "technofossils".

==== Trace elements ====
In terms of trace elements, there are a range of distinct signatures left by modern societies. For example, in the Upper Fremont Glacier in Wyoming, there is a layer of chlorine present in ice cores from 1960's atomic weapon testing programs, as well as a layer of mercury associated with coal plants in the 1980s.

From the late 1940s, nuclear tests have led to local nuclear fallout and severe contamination of test sites both on land and in the surrounding marine environment. Some of the radionuclides that were released during the tests are ^{137}Cs, ^{90}Sr, ^{239}Pu, ^{240}Pu, ^{241}Am, and ^{131}I. These have been found to have had significant impact on the environment and on human beings. In particular, ^{137}Cs and ^{90}Sr have been found to have been released into the marine environment and led to bioaccumulation over a period through food chain cycles. The carbon isotope ^{14}C, commonly released during nuclear tests, has also been found to be integrated into the atmospheric CO_{2}, and infiltrating the biosphere, through ocean-atmosphere gas exchange. Increase in thyroid cancer rates around the world is also surmised to be correlated with increasing proportions of the ^{131}I radionuclide.

The highest global concentration of radionuclides was estimated to have been in 1965, one of the dates which has been proposed as a possible benchmark for the start of the formally defined Anthropocene.

Human burning of fossil fuels has also left distinctly elevated concentrations of black carbon, inorganic ash, and spherical carbonaceous particles in recent sediments across the world. Concentrations of these components increases markedly and almost simultaneously around the world beginning around 1950.

=== Anthropocene markers ===
A marker that accounts for a substantial global impact of humans on the total environment, comparable in scale to those associated with significant perturbations of the geological past, is needed in place of minor changes in atmosphere composition. A range of markers characterizing the period have been identified, such as silicone or aluminium, but most prominently plastic, with plastic, reminiscent of archaeological ages like the Iron Age, marking an archaeological plastic age or the anthropocene even as a geological plastic epoch.

A useful candidate for holding markers in the geologic time record is the pedosphere. Soils retain information about their climatic and geochemical history with features lasting for centuries or millennia. Human activity is now firmly established as the sixth factor of soil formation. Humanity affects pedogenesis directly by, for example, land levelling, trenching and embankment building, landscape-scale control of fire by early humans, organic matter enrichment from additions of manure or other waste, organic matter impoverishment due to continued cultivation and compaction from overgrazing. Human activity also affects pedogenesis indirectly by drift of eroded materials or pollutants. Anthropogenic soils are those markedly affected by human activities, such as repeated ploughing, the addition of fertilisers, contamination, sealing, or enrichment with artefacts (in the World Reference Base for Soil Resources they are classified as Anthrosols and Technosols). An example from archaeology would be dark earth phenomena when long-term human habitation enriches the soil with black carbon.

Anthropogenic soils are recalcitrant repositories of artefacts and properties that testify to the dominance of the human impact, and hence appear to be reliable markers for the Anthropocene. Some anthropogenic soils may be viewed as the 'golden spikes' of geologists (Global Boundary Stratotype Section and Point), which are locations where there are strata successions with clear evidences of a worldwide event, including the appearance of distinctive fossils. Drilling for fossil fuels has also created holes and tubes which are expected to be detectable for millions of years. The astrobiologist David Grinspoon has proposed that the site of the Apollo 11 Lunar landing, with the disturbances and artifacts that are so uniquely characteristic of our species' technological activity and which will survive over geological time spans could be considered as the 'golden spike' of the Anthropocene.

An October 2020 study coordinated by University of Colorado at Boulder found that distinct physical, chemical and biological changes to Earth's rock layers began around the year 1950. The research revealed that since about 1950, humans have doubled the amount of fixed nitrogen on the planet through industrial production for agriculture, created a hole in the ozone layer through the industrial scale release of chlorofluorocarbons (CFCs), released enough greenhouse gases from fossil fuels to cause planetary level climate change, created tens of thousands of synthetic mineral-like compounds that do not naturally occur on Earth, and caused almost one-fifth of river sediment worldwide to no longer reach the ocean due to dams, reservoirs and diversions. Humans have produced so many millions of tons of plastic each year since the early 1950s that microplastics are "forming a near-ubiquitous and unambiguous marker of Anthropocene". The study highlights a strong correlation between global human population size and growth, global productivity and global energy use and that the "extraordinary outburst of consumption and productivity demonstrates how the Earth System has departed from its Holocene state since c. 1950 CE, forcing abrupt physical, chemical and biological changes to the Earth's stratigraphic record that can be used to justify the proposal for naming a new epoch—the Anthropocene."

A December 2020 study published in Nature found that the total anthropogenic mass, or human-made materials, outweighs all the biomass on earth, and highlighted that "this quantification of the human enterprise gives a mass-based quantitative and symbolic characterization of the human-induced epoch of the Anthropocene."

== Debates ==
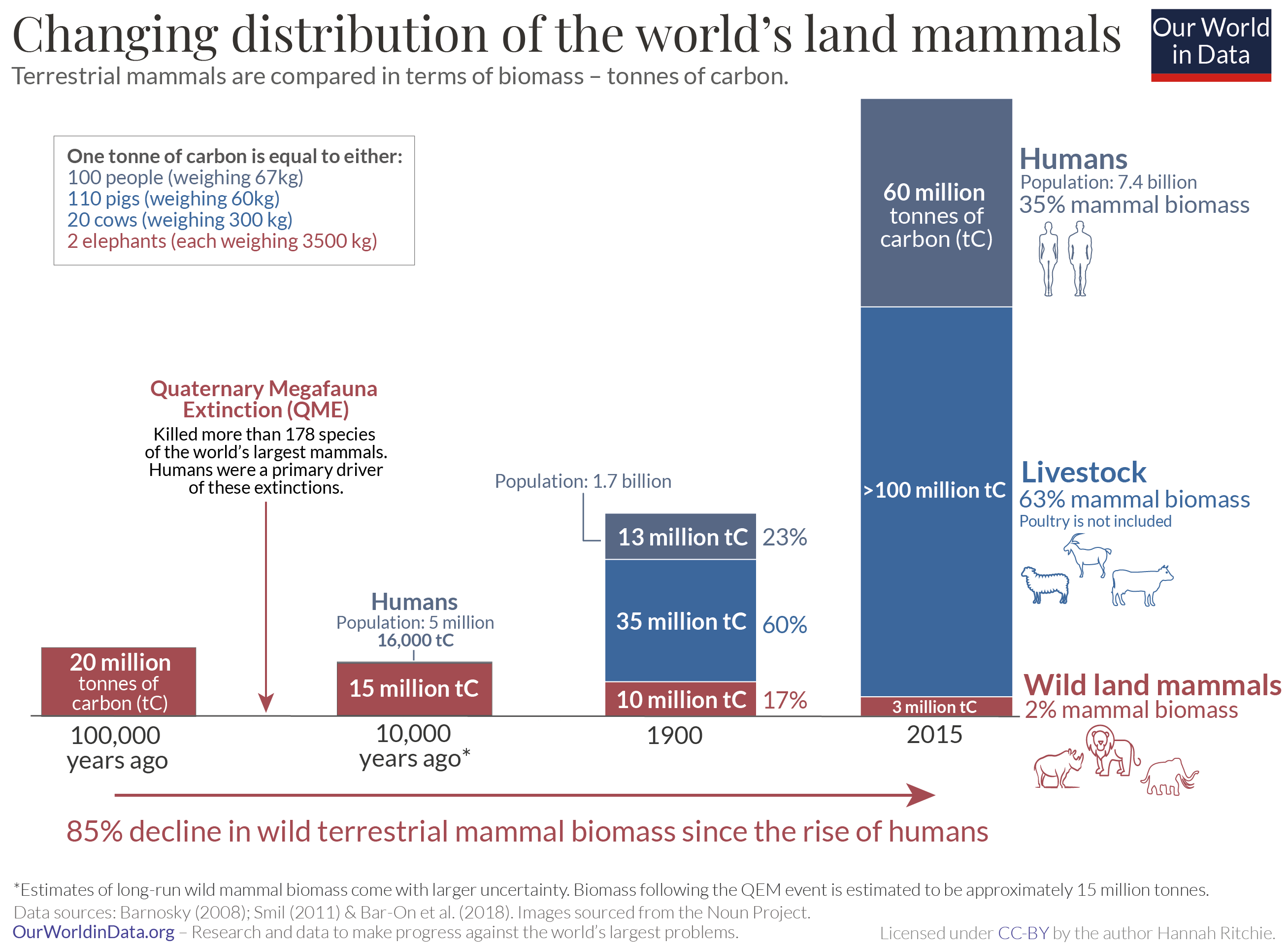
"While we often think of ecological damage as a modern problem our impacts date back millennia to the times in which humans lived as hunter-gatherers. Our history with wild animals has been a zero-sum game: either we hunted them to extinction, or we destroyed their habitats with agricultural land." – Hannah Ritchie for Our World in Data.

Although the validity of Anthropocene as a scientific term remains disputed, its underlying premise, i.e., that humans have become a geological force, or rather, the dominant force shaping the Earth's climate, has found traction among academics and the public. In an opinion piece for Philosophical Transactions of the Royal Society B, Rodolfo Dirzo, Gerardo Ceballos, and Paul R. Ehrlich write that the term is "increasingly penetrating the lexicon of not only the academic socio-sphere, but also society more generally", and is now included as an entry in the Oxford English Dictionary. The University of Cambridge, as another example, offers a degree in Anthropocene Studies. In the public sphere, the term Anthropocene has become increasingly ubiquitous in activist, pundit, and political discourses. Some who are critical of the term Anthropocene nevertheless concede that "For all its problems, [it] carries power." The popularity and currency of the word has led scholars to label the term a "charismatic meta-category" or "charismatic mega-concept." The term, regardless, has been subject to a variety of criticisms from social scientists, philosophers, Indigenous scholars, and others.

The anthropologist John Hartigan has argued that due to its status as a charismatic meta-category, the term Anthropocene marginalizes competing, but less visible, concepts such as that of "multispecies." The more salient charge is that the ready acceptance of Anthropocene is due to its conceptual proximity to the status quo – that is, to notions of human individuality and centrality.

Other scholars appreciate the way in which the term Anthropocene recognizes humanity as a geological force, but take issue with the indiscriminate way in which it does. Not all humans are equally responsible for the climate crisis. To that end, scholars such as the feminist theorist Donna Haraway and sociologist Jason Moore, have suggested naming the Epoch instead as the Capitalocene. Such implies capitalism as the fundamental reason for the ecological crisis, rather than just humans in general. However, according to philosopher Steven Best, humans have created "hierarchical and growth-addicted societies" and have demonstrated "ecocidal proclivities" long before the emergence of capitalism. Hartigan, Bould, and Haraway all critique what Anthropocene does as a term; however, Hartigan and Bould differ from Haraway in that they criticize the utility or validity of a geological framing of the climate crisis, whereas Haraway embraces it.

In addition to "Capitalocene," other terms have also been proposed by scholars to trace the roots of the Epoch to causes other than the human species broadly. Janae Davis, for example, has suggested the "Plantationocene" as a more appropriate term to call attention to the role that plantation agriculture has played in the formation of the Epoch, alongside Kathryn Yusoff's argument that racism as a whole is foundational to the Epoch. The Plantationocene concept traces "the ways that plantation logics organize modern economies, environments, bodies, and social relations." In a similar vein, environmental humanities scholars like Heather Davis and Indigenous studies scholars such as Métis geographer Zoe Todd have argued that the Epoch must be dated back to the colonization of the Americas, as this "names the problem of colonialism as responsible for contemporary environmental crisis." Potawatomi philosopher Kyle Powys Whyte has further argued that the Anthropocene has been apparent to Indigenous peoples in the Americas since the inception of colonialism because of "colonialism's role in environmental change."

Other critiques of Anthropocene have focused on the genealogy of the concept. Todd also provides a phenomenological account, which draws on the work of the philosopher Sara Ahmed, writing: "When discourses and responses to the Anthropocene are being generated within institutions and disciplines which are embedded in broader systems that act as de facto 'white public space,' the academy and its power dynamics must be challenged." Other aspects which constitute current understandings of the concept of the Anthropocene such as the ontological split between nature and society, the assumption of the centrality and individuality of the human, and the framing of environmental discourse in largely scientific terms have been criticized by scholars as concepts rooted in colonialism and which reinforce systems of postcolonial domination. To that end, Todd makes the case that the concept of Anthropocene must be indigenized and decolonized if it is to become a vehicle of justice as opposed to white thought and domination.

Eco-philosopher David Abram, in a book chapter titled 'Interbreathing in the Humilocene', has proposed adoption of the term 'Humilocene' (the Epoch of Humility), which emphasizes an ethical imperative and ecocultural direction that human societies should take. The term plays with the etymological roots of the term 'human', thus connecting it back with terms such as humility, humus (the soil), and even a corrective sense of humiliation that some human societies should feel given their collective destructive impact on the earth.

=== "Early anthropocene" model ===
William Ruddiman has argued that the Anthropocene began approximately 8,000 years ago with the development of farming and sedentary cultures. At that point, humans were dispersed across all continents except Antarctica, and the Neolithic Revolution was ongoing. During this period, humans developed agriculture and animal husbandry to supplement or replace hunter-gatherer subsistence. Such innovations were followed by a wave of extinctions, beginning with large mammals and terrestrial birds. This wave was driven by both the direct activity of humans (e.g. hunting) and the indirect consequences of land-use change for agriculture. Landscape-scale burning by prehistoric hunter-gathers may have been an additional early source of anthropogenic atmospheric carbon. Ruddiman also claims that the greenhouse gas emissions in-part responsible for the Anthropocene began 8,000 years ago when ancient farmers cleared forests to grow crops.

Ruddiman's work has been challenged with data from an earlier interglaciation ("Stage 11", approximately 400,000 years ago) which suggests that 16,000 more years must elapse before the current Holocene interglaciation comes to an end, and thus the early anthropogenic hypothesis is invalid. Also, the argument that "something" is needed to explain the differences in the Holocene is challenged by more recent research showing that all interglacials are different.

=== Homogenocene ===
Homogenocene (from old Greek: homo-, same; geno-, kind; kainos-, new;) is a more specific term used to define our current epoch, in which biodiversity is diminishing and biogeography and ecosystems around the globe seem more and more similar to one another mainly due to invasive species that have been introduced around the globe either on purpose (crops, livestock) or inadvertently. This is due to the newfound globalism that humans participate in, as species traveling across the world to another region was not as easily possible in any point of time in history as it is today.

The term Homogenocene was first used by Michael Samways in his editorial article in the Journal of Insect Conservation from 1999 titled "Translocating fauna to foreign lands: Here comes the Homogenocene."

The term was used again by John L. Curnutt in the year 2000 in Ecology, in a short list titled "A Guide to the Homogenocene", which reviewed Alien species in North America and Hawaii: impacts on natural ecosystems by George Cox. Charles C. Mann, in his acclaimed book 1493: Uncovering the New World Columbus Created, gives a bird's-eye view of the mechanisms and ongoing implications of the homogenocene.

== Society and culture ==
=== Humanities ===
The concept of the Anthropocene has also been approached via humanities such as philosophy, literature and art. In the scholarly world, it has been the subject of increasing attention through special journals, conferences, and disciplinary reports. The Anthropocene, its attendant timescale, and ecological implications prompt questions about death and the end of civilisation, memory and archives, the scope and methods of humanistic inquiry, and emotional responses to the "end of nature". Some scholars have posited that the realities of the Anthropocene, including "human-induced biodiversity loss, exponential increases in per-capita resource consumption, and global climate change," have made the goal of environmental sustainability largely unattainable and obsolete.

Historians have actively engaged the Anthropocene. In 2000, the same year that Paul Crutzen coined the term, world historian John McNeill published Something New Under the Sun, tracing the rise of human societies' unprecedented impact on the planet in the twentieth century. In 2001, historian of science Naomi Oreskes revealed the systematic efforts to undermine trust in climate change science and went on to detail the corporate interests delaying action on the environmental challenge. Both McNeill and Oreskes became members of the Anthropocene Working Group because of their work correlating human activities and planetary transformation.

Bridie Lonie has reflected that the Anthropocene has been a theme for art in New Zealand since the 1970s. Often working outside the art institutions as societally challenging intervention art also "Interrupting the Automatism" in the activation, decision making and ultimate control of especially urban public space

=== Popular culture ===
- In 2019, the English musician Nick Mulvey released a music video on YouTube named "In the Anthropocene". In cooperation with Sharp's Brewery, the song was recorded on 105 vinyl records made of washed-up plastic from the Cornish coast.
- The Anthropocene Reviewed is a podcast and book by author John Green, where he "reviews different facets of the human-centered planet on a five-star scale".
- Photographer Edward Burtynsky created "The Anthropocene Project" with Jennifer Baichwal and Nicholas de Pencier, which is a collection of photographs, exhibitions, a film, and a book. His photographs focus on landscape photography that captures the effects human beings have had on the earth.
- In 2015, the American death metal band Cattle Decapitation released its seventh studio album titled The Anthropocene Extinction.
- In 2020, Canadian musician Grimes released her fifth studio album titled Miss Anthropocene. The name is also a pun on the feminine title "Miss" and the words "misanthrope" and "Anthropocene."

== See also ==
- Earth Overshoot Day – Calculated calendar date when humanity's yearly consumption exceeds Earth's replenishment
- Ecological footprint – Individual's or a group's human demand on nature
- Ecological overshoot – Demands on ecosystem exceeding regeneration
- Prehistoric human impacts on the environment
- Holocene extinction – Ongoing extinction event caused by human activity
- Novel ecosystem – Human-created ecological niche
- Overconsumption (economics) – Resource use exceeding carrying capacity
- Planetary boundaries – Limits to safe impact on the Earth ecology
