= William Ruddiman =

American palaeoclimatologist and professor

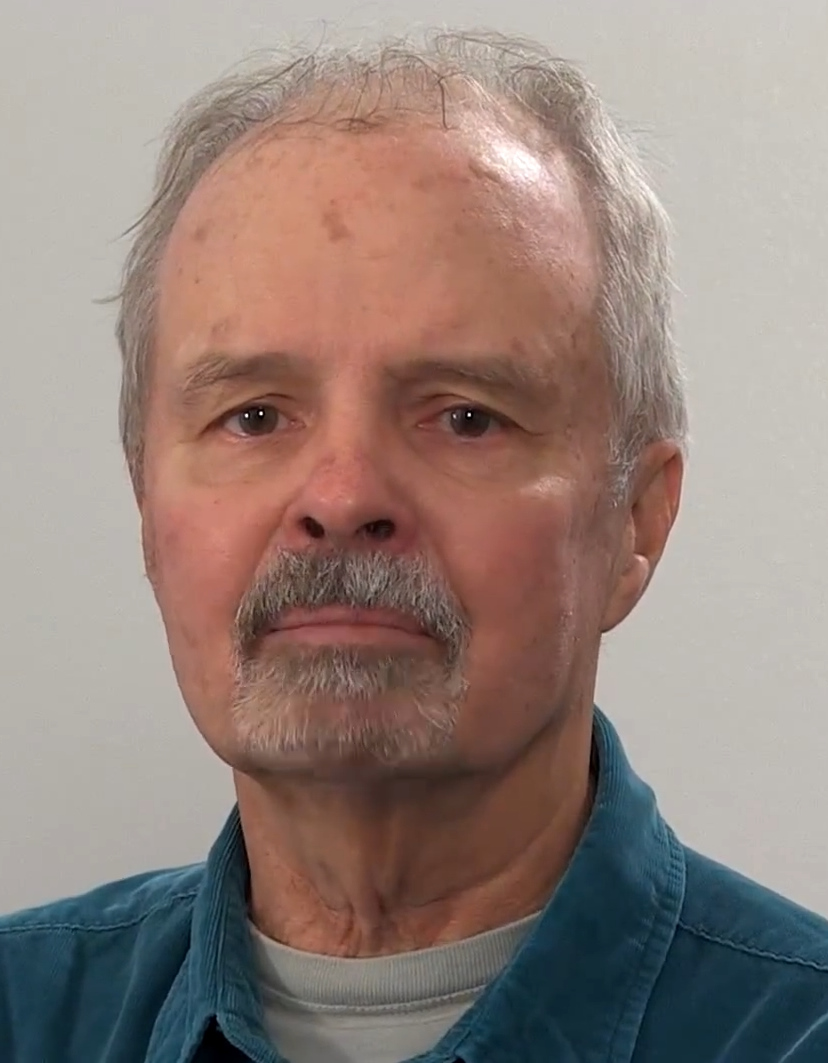
William Ruddiman in 2015

William F. Ruddiman is a palaeoclimatologist and Professor Emeritus at the University of Virginia. Ruddiman earned an undergraduate degree in geology in 1964 at Williams College, and a Ph.D. in marine geology from Columbia University in 1969. Ruddiman worked at the US Naval Oceanographic Office from 1969 to 1976, and at Columbia's Lamont–Doherty Earth Observatory from 1976 to 1991. He moved to Virginia in 1991, serving as a professor in Environmental Sciences. Ruddiman's research interests center on climate change over several time scales. He is a Fellow of both the Geological Society of America and the American Geophysical Union. Ruddiman has participated in 15 oceanographic cruises, and was co-chief of two deep-sea drilling cruises.

Ruddiman is best known for his 'early anthropocene' hypothesis (or 'Ruddiman hypothesis'), the idea that human-induced changes in greenhouse gases did not begin in the eighteenth century with advent of coal-burning factories and power plants of the industrial era but date back to 8,000 years ago, triggered by the intense farming activities of our early agrarian ancestors. It was at that time that atmospheric greenhouse gas concentrations stopped following the periodic pattern of rises and falls that had accurately characterized their past long-term behavior, a pattern which is well explained by natural variations in the Earth's orbit known as Milankovitch cycles. In his overdue-glaciation hypothesis Ruddiman claims that an incipient ice age would probably have begun several thousand years ago, but the arrival of that scheduled ice age was forestalled by the activities of early farmers. The overdue-glaciation hypothesis has been challenged on the grounds that alternative explanations are sufficient to account for the current warm anomaly without recourse to human activity, but Ruddiman challenges the methodology of his critics (see external links).

Ruddiman is also known for his hypothesis in the 1980s that the tectonic uplift of Tibet created the highly seasonal monsoonal circulation that dominates Asia today. With his then graduate student Maureen Raymo he hypothesised that the uplift of the Himalayas and Tibetan Plateau caused a reduction in atmospheric CO_{2} through increases in chemical weathering and was therefore a major causal factor in the Cenozoic Cooling trend that eventually led to our most recent series of Ice Ages.

He was awarded the Lyell Medal of the Geological Society of London for 2010.

He has written several books: Plows, Plagues, and Petroleum: How Humans Took Control of Climate, a textbook on climate science, Earth's Climate, Past and Future, and most recently Earth Transformed, the subject of the 2014 American Geophysical Union's Tyndall Lecture. He has published over 125 scientific papers.
