= Sixteen Mile Creek =

Sixteen Mile Creek or Sixteenmile Creek may refer to:

== Canada ==
Ontario

- Sixteen Mile Creek (Halton Region), which flows to the northwest shore of Lake Ontario
- Sixteen Mile Creek (Muskoka District), a tributary of the Boyne River
- Sixteen Mile Creek (Niagara Region), which flows to the southwest shore of Lake Ontario
- Sixteenmile Creek (Ontario), in Elgin County, which flows into Lake Erie

== United States ==
- Sixteenmile Creek (Florida), a tributary of the St. Johns River
- Sixteen Mile Creek (Montana), a tributary of the Missouri River
- Sixteenmile Creek (Ohio), which flows into Lake Erie
