= Campbellville, Ontario =

Rural community in Ontario, Canada

Campbellville
- Compact Rural Community
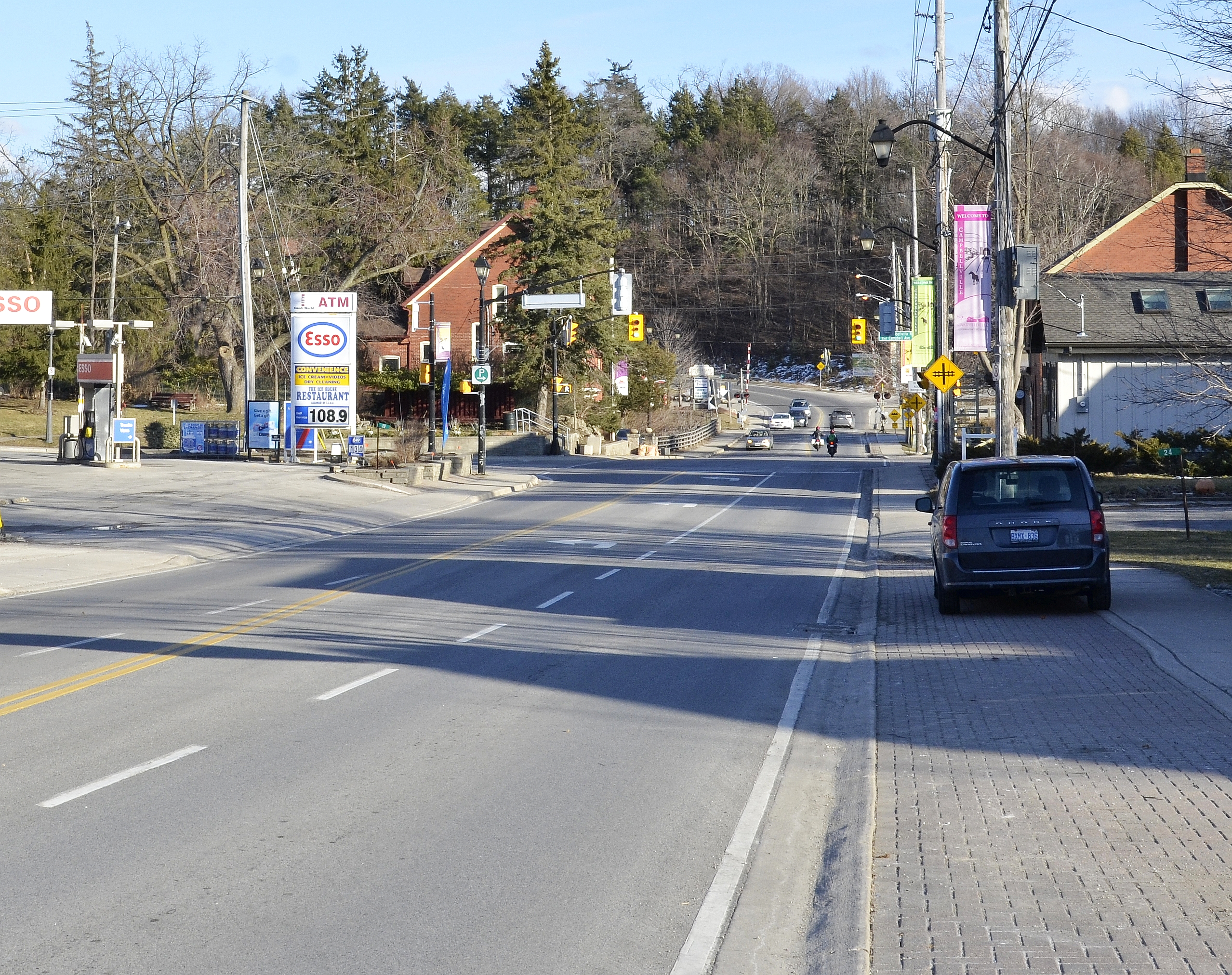
- Etymology: Named for John Campbell
- Location of Campbellville Campbellville (Southern Ontario)
- Coordinates: 43°29′17″N 79°58′56″W
- Country: Canada
- Province: Ontario
- Regional municipality: Halton
- Town: Milton
- Settled: 1832
- Police village: 1914
- Amalgamated: 1974
- Time zone: UTC-5 (Eastern Time Zone)
  - Summer (DST): UTC-4 (Eastern Time Zone)
- Postal code: L0P 1B0
- Area codes: 905, 289, 365
- NTS Map: 030M05
- GNBC Code: FAOED

Campbellville is a compact rural community in the geographic township of Nassagaweya in the Town of Milton, Ontario. It is on the Niagara Escarpment and is a tourist destination for residents of the Greater Toronto Area.

== History ==
Campbellville is named for John Campbell, who settled there in 1832. A saw mill was later built. A tavern was opened in 1847 by Mr. Priest. A hotel was also located in the early settlement, which burned down around 1930. The first store and post office were noted in 1849, located in William Campbell's home and operated by Malcolm Campbell.

Campbelleville was incorporated as a police village in 1914.

Campbellville was originally part of Nassagaweya Township, and it was noted in 1932 that Campbellville "was, as it is now, the most important centre" in the township. Nassagaweya Township was part of Halton County until 1974, when the Regional Municipality of Halton was created and the township became part of the town of Milton.

== Arts and culture ==
Located in Campbellville are Mohawk Racetrack, a harness racing venue; Crawford Lake Conservation Area, Mennonite furniture shops, an ice cream parlour, Halton County Railway Museum, and Cristello's Village Market. The world's largest antique leaded stained glass store and museum, The Stonehouse of Campbellville, was opened in Campbellville in 1976.

Churches include St. David's Presbyterian Church, founded in 1869. Its current building dates to 1891 with an addition built in 1999. St. David's cemetery dates back to 1908.

The Serbian Orthodox Eparchy of Canada has its episcopal headquarters in Campbellville.

== Education ==
- Hitherfield School
- Brookville Public School
- Hitherfield School, a private co-educational day school

== Notable people ==
- Grand Duchess Olga Alexandrovna of Russia (13 June [O.S. 1 June] 1882 – 24 November 1960), escaped to Canada after World War II and settled in the area before moving to Cooksville.
- Mac Clark (born March 26, 2004), racing driver
- Bruce Hood (March 14, 1936 – January 5, 2018), NHL referee, travel industry professional and politician.
- Charles Clarence "Clare" Laking (February 21, 1899 – November 26, 2005), believed to be the longest lived World War I veteran in Canada who fought on the front lines.
- Ronald Roberts (June 1, 1925 – July 4, 2012), WHA and NHL executive and insurance industry executive
- Michael Sgarbossa, ice hockey forward for the Washington Capitals and Hershey Bears
- Joel "deadmau5" Zimmerman, progressive music DJ and producer

== See also ==
- Rattlesnake Point
- Conservation Halton
- Glen Eden (Ski Area)
- Kelso Conservation Area
- Halton County Radial Railway Museum
- Hilton Falls Conservation Area
- List of unincorporated communities in Ontario
