= Ronald Roberts =

Ronald or Ron Roberts may refer to:

- Ron Roberts (American football) (born 1967), American football coach
- Ron Roberts (coach) (1931–2012), American football, wrestling, and tennis coach and college athletics administrator
- Ron Roberts (footballer) (1942–2026), football winger
- Ron Roberts (politician) (born 1944), Australian politician
- Ron Roberts (rugby league) (1927–2003), Australian rugby league player
- Ronald Roberts (basketball) (born 1991), American-Dominican basketball player
- Ronald Roberts (ice hockey executive) (1925–2012), Canadian ice hockey executive
- Ronald Roberts (swimmer) (1922–2012), British swimmer
- Ronald Roberts (veterinary surgeon) (1941–2024), Scottish veterinary pathologist
- Ronald Suresh Roberts (born 1968), British West Indian biographer, lawyer and writer
