= Nassagaweya Township, Ontario =

Former municipality in Halton Region, Ontario, Canada

Coordinates: 43°32′00″N 80°01′59″W

Nassagaweya Township is a geographic township and former municipality now part of Milton.

The township was created in 1819, its name derived from the Mississauga word nazhesahgewayyong, meaning 'river with two outlets.' This refers to the fact that watercourses in the township drain to both Lake Ontario and the Grand River system.

Nassagaweya township became part of the Town of Milton in 1974.

Communities within the boundaries of the former township include: Campbellville, Brookville, Moffat, Haltonville, Darbyville, Guelph Junction and Sayers Mills. Nassagaweya historically contained Eden Mills and borders on Kilbride.

The heritage house Nassagaweya in Brisbane, Australia was named after the township being the birthplace of the house's owner John Gillies.

== Organization of schools ==
By 1862, there were six schools in the township:

- In Concession 3, at lots 4, 10, 15 and 29
- In Concession 4, at lot 22
- In Concession 7, at lot 25

By 1960 there were ten school sections, most of which were consolidated into two public schools that fall. However, S.S. 6 continued to be managed by its own trustees, and did not close until 1965.

School	S.S.	Formed	Location	Name given
Brookville PS	1	1830	R.R. 3, Campbellville	
Brookville PS	2		R.R. 1, Campbellville	Hutcheon's; Allison's (1837)
Brookville PS	3	1836	Moffat	
Brookville PS	4	1863	R.R. 1, Campbellville	
Brookville PS	5	1874	R.R. 1, Campbellville	
Brookville PS	6	1864	R.R. 2, Campbellville	Richmond; Kelso; Christie
Brookville PS	7	1872	R. R. 2, Rockwood	Pinegrove
Brookville PS	8	1867	R. R. 1, Acton	
Brookville PS	9		R. R. 2, Rockwood	Bloomsbury
Campbellville PS	10	1927	Campbellville	Campbellville

== Attractions ==
- Halton County Radial Railway
- Mohawk Raceway
- Mountsberg Conservation Area
- Crawford Lake Conservation Area
- Hilton Falls Conservation Area

== See also ==
- List of townships in Ontario
