= Sixteen Mile Creek (Halton Region) =

Sixteen Mile Creek Rivière de Gravois ("gravelly river" in French)
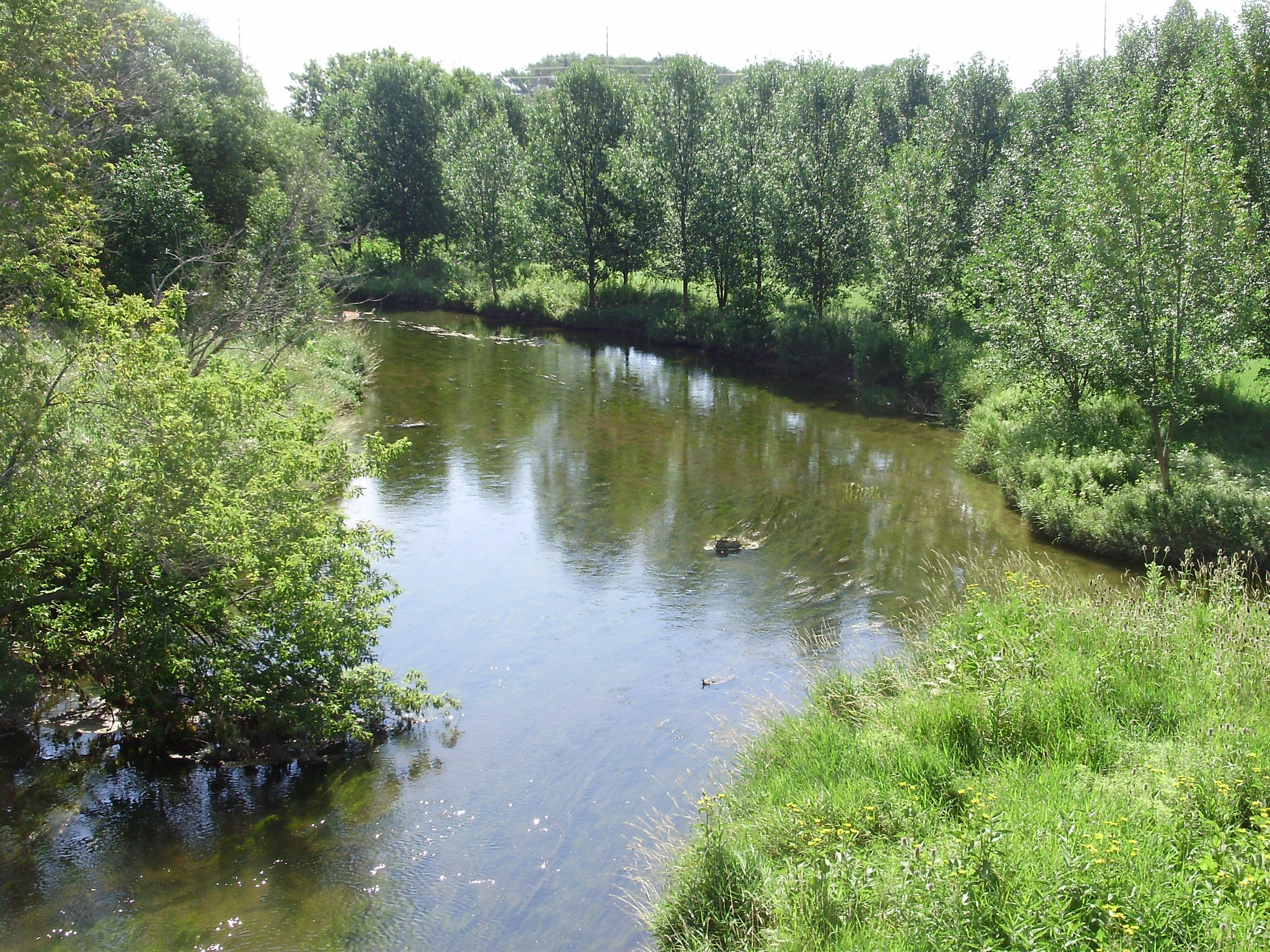
- Sixteen Mile at Milton, Ontario

- Location of the mouth of Sixteen Mile Creek in southern Ontario
- Native name: niizhozaagiwan (Eastern Ojibwa)

Location
- Country: Canada
- Province: Ontario
- Region: Greater Toronto Area
- Regional Municipality: Halton
- Municipalities: Oakville, Milton

Physical characteristics
- Source: wetland
  - location: Milton
  - coordinates: 43°35′08″N 80°02′34″W
  - elevation: 365 m (1,198 ft)
- Mouth: Lake Ontario
  - location: Oakville
  - coordinates: 43°26′22″N 79°39′57″W
  - elevation: 74 m (243 ft)
- Basin size: 372 km^{2} (144 sq mi)

Basin features
- River system: Great Lakes Basin

Sixteen Mile Creek is a river in Halton Region in the Greater Toronto Area of Ontario, Canada. It is in the Great Lakes Basin, and flows from the Niagara Escarpment through the towns of Milton and Oakville to Lake Ontario.

The creek is named for the distance from the river's mouth to the western end of Lake Ontario. It was previously known to the Mississauga Indians in their language as Ne-sauga y-onk or niizhozaagiwan ("having two outlets") and to the French as Rivière de Gravois ("gravelly river").

Like many creeks draining into Lake Ontario, Sixteen Mile Creek has cut a deep valley that is home to a broad range of wildlife, including whitetail deer, raccoons, foxes, opossum, and squirrels. The forest contains tree species typical of the Carolinian forest habitat, although since this is close to the northern limit of this zone, some are poorly represented. The total area of the drainage basin is 372 square kilometres (144 sq mi).

In Oakville, it also forms part of Glen Abbey Golf Course and is home to the Oakville Yacht Squadron.

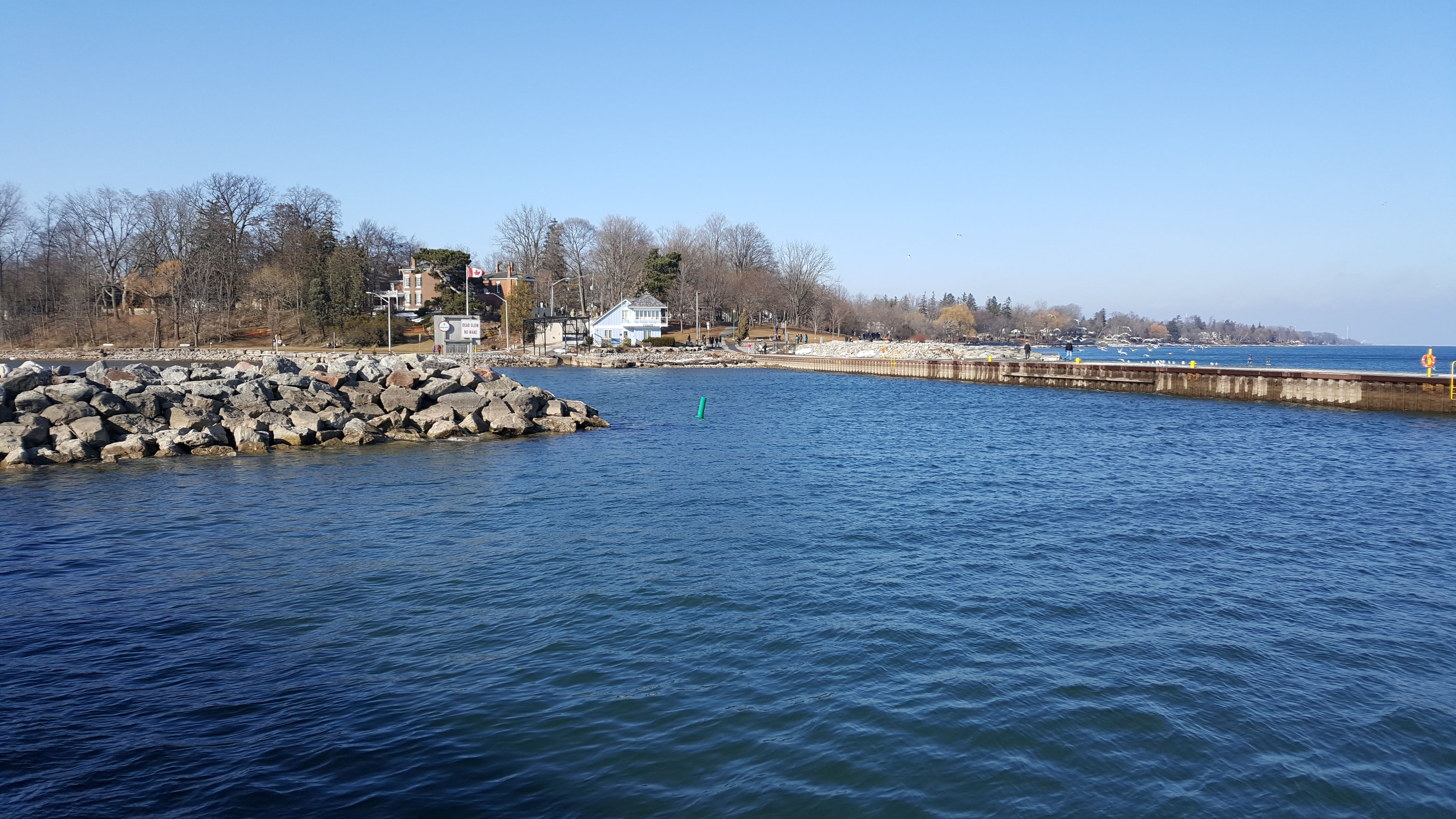
Mouth of the creek

== Fishing ==
Conservation Halton identifies Sixteen Mile Creek as an excellent fishing site in Oakville and Milton. The entire watershed provide numerous angling opportunities.

According to Conservation Halton the west branch provides excellent coldwater habitat for brook, brown and rainbow trout. During their spawning runs, both in spring and fall, chinook salmon can be seen in Sixteen Mile Creek. Stocked trout had been unsuccessfully introduced to the Mill Pond near downtown Milton. Although the pond does not provide suitable habitat to sustain trout populations it is a great location for fishing a number of panfish and carp. Both the middle and east branches provide opportunities for smallmouth bass fishing. In addition the lower reaches near Lake Ontario provide a migratory corridor for Lake Ontario fish. Oakville Harbour is a relaxing urban setting for angling trout and salmon before they make their spawning voyage upward Sixteen Mile Creek. The rocky banks of the Oakville Harbour provide excellent habitat for smallmouth bass.

== Hiking ==
According to Town of Oakville The Sixteen Mile Creek Trail runs through the centre of Oakville, on either side; the east and west bank of the Sixteen Mile Creek. Sixteen Mile Creek Trail is a part of 60 kilometers long Oakville Heritage Trail network. Trails network features information stations telling over eighty stories about land and its people, dating from 9000 BC to AD 2000. The trails link all areas of the community and reflect Oakville's natural, human and built heritage. Heritage trails were created as a Millennial project in partnership with the Oakville Community Foundation. In 2017, three new trail projects including a new heritage information station honouring indigenous heritage was completed in conjunction with Canada's 150th Birthday celebrations.

== Moccasin Trail ==
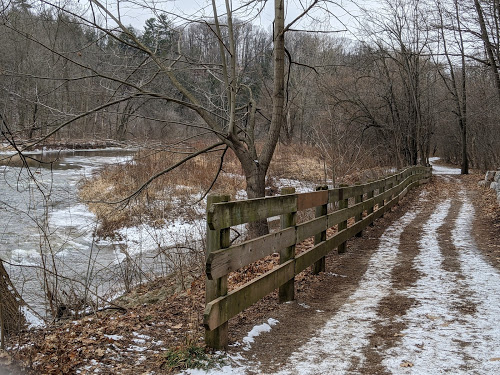
Moccasin Trail

Moccasin Trail forms the Inner Valley Trail portion of the Sixteen Mile Creek Trail, a 6.1 kilometer heavily trafficked loop suitable for all skill levels according to AllTrails. The Moccasin Trail starts at the sharp descend created by bluffs of Queenston formation shale. making the trail impassable along the river bank. The rest of the Sixteen Mile Creek Trail snakes harmoniously along the picturesque west riverbank. The Inner Valley Trail cover almost half the distance between Dundas bridge to the north at Lions Valley Park and Smith Triller Viaduct at the Glen Abby Golf Course to the south. Sixteen Mile Creek Moccasin Trail is one of the two similar trails honouring Oakville's rich Indigenous heritage. The other Moccasin Trail is located along the Bronte Creek Heritage Trail. The Moccasin Trail Heritage Information Kiosk is located near Rebecca Street and Mississauga Street on the Bronte Creek Heritage Trail. The Moccasin Trails feature a series of 13 plaques containing Indigenous stories, verses and information relating to the land, water and sky, giving visitors a deeper understanding of Indigenous heritage.

== Invasive Species ==
Giant hogweed (Heracleum mantegazzianum) is a non-native invasive plant that is most widely distributed in Halton Region along Sixteen Mile Creek. Contact with this plant can cause serious burns to the skin and temporary or permanent blindness.

Wild parsnip (Pastinaca sativa), also known as poison parsnip, is an invasive plant. Similar to that of giant hogweed the sap containing chemicals that can cause human skin to react to sunlight, resulting in intense burns, rashes or blisters. European settlers have brought them into North America for their edible roots. The plant subsequently has escaped from cultivations into wilderness.

The Town of Oakville who owns and maintains the groomed trails around Sixteen Mile Creek runs several campaigns for residents to learn how to identify invasive plants, to stay on trails and away from areas known to have invasive species, to inspect, clean and remove mud, seeds and plant parts from clothing, pets such as dogs and including horses, vehicles including bicycles and equipment such as mowers and tools and to avoid disturbing soil and removing plants from natural areas.

== See also ==
- Kelso Conservation Area
- List of rivers of Ontario

== Sources ==
- Map 3 (PDF) (Map). 1 : 700,000. Official road map of Ontario. Ministry of Transportation of Ontario. 1 January 2010.
- Restructured municipalities - Ontario map #6 (Map). Restructuring Maps of Ontario. Ontario Ministry of Municipal Affairs and Housing. 2006.
