= Darbyville, Ontario =

Darbyville
- locality
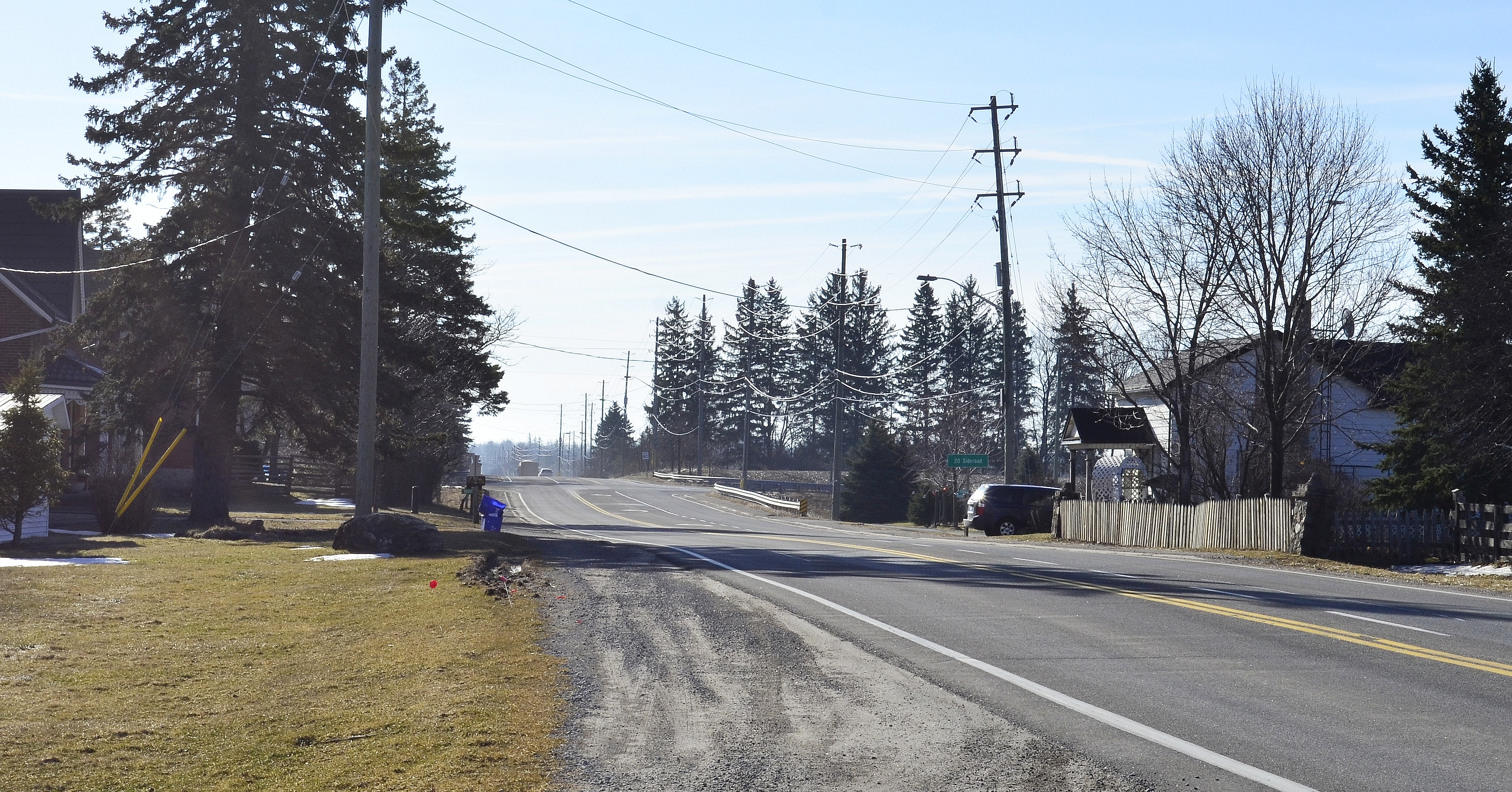
- Looking south on Guelph Line in Darbyville
- Nickname: Darb's
- Location of Darbyville Darbyville (Southern Ontario)
- Coordinates: 43°32′42″N 80°03′52″W
- Country: Canada
- Province: Ontario
- Regional municipality: Halton
- Town: Milton

Government
  - Mayor: Kees VanNeck
  - MP: Cole Martin
- Time zone: UTC-5 (Eastern (EST))
  - Summer (DST): UTC-4 (EDT)
- GNBC Code: FAVIM

Darbyville is a small locality in the Town of Milton, Halton Region, Ontario, Canada. The settlement was originally located in the then political (now geographic) Nassagaweya Township, Halton County.

== Geography ==
Darbyville is located along the Guelph Line (Regional Road 1), at the intersection with 20 Side Road (Regional Road 34). Mountsberg Creek flows through Darbyville. It is surrounded by farmland and there is a golf course nearby.

== History ==
John Taylor built a house there in 1837. The following year, Edward and Robert Darby, namesake of the settlement, opened a blacksmith and wagon-making shop.

A carpenter shop and general store were established many years later. Wagon-making was continued in the settlement by the Pickett and Erwin families.

While Campbellville was the principal urban center in Nassagaweya Township, Darbyville was one of several smaller communities, along with Brookville, Moffat, and Knatchbull. In 1974, as part of southern Ontario's organization into regional government, it became part of the town of Milton.
