= Sayers Mills, Ontario =

Sayers Mills
- dispersed rural community
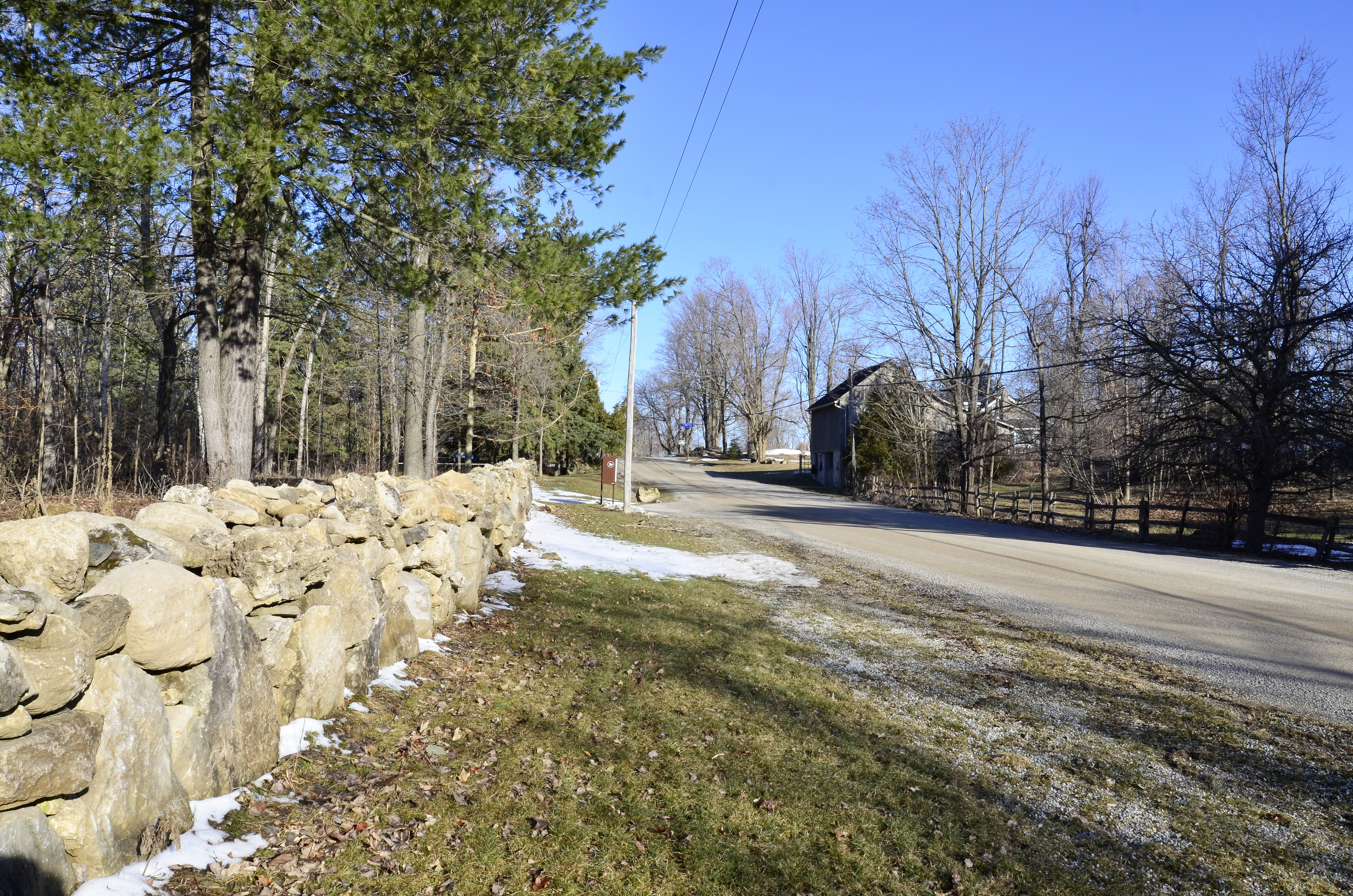
- Fifth Line Nassagaweya in Sayers Mills

- Location of Sayers Mills Sayers Mills (Southern Ontario)
- Coordinates: 43°32′44″N 80°00′53″W
- Country: Canada
- Province: Ontario
- Regional municipality: Halton
- Town: Halton Hills
- Time zone: UTC-5 (Eastern (EST))
  - Summer (DST): UTC-4 (EDT)
- GNBC Code: FEBAD

Sayers Mills is a dispersed rural community in the Town of Milton, Halton Region, Ontario, Canada.

Sixteen Mile Creek flows through the settlement.

== History ==
The settlement was founded as a lumber mill in 1847 by Thomas Easterbrook. The mill was purchased in 1877 by Henry Cargill. At that time, the property contained five buildings, a pond, and the mill. The property was later sold to Peter Sayers, namesake of the settlement, who operated the mill and built a family home there. In 1895, Sayers installed steam power at the mill.

The mill was the largest in Nassagaweya Township, with two saws capable of turning out 25,000 to 30,000 board feet per day. During its busy season, the mill employed between 10 and 12 workers, who lived in a bunkhouse on site. The milled lumber was taken to Guelph by horse-drawn wagons and sleighs until 1890, when a railway was built through nearby Moffat. The wood was purchased by manufacturer Massey-Harris, and was used on farm machinery. The mill also produced shingles.

In 1902, the mill burned down, and was rebuilt the following year.

The mill closed in 1922, and a dam located there broke during the 1940s.

The Sayers Mill property is recognized as a "significant heritage resource" by the Town of Milton.
