= Mill Pond (Halton Region) =

Lake in Ontario, Canada

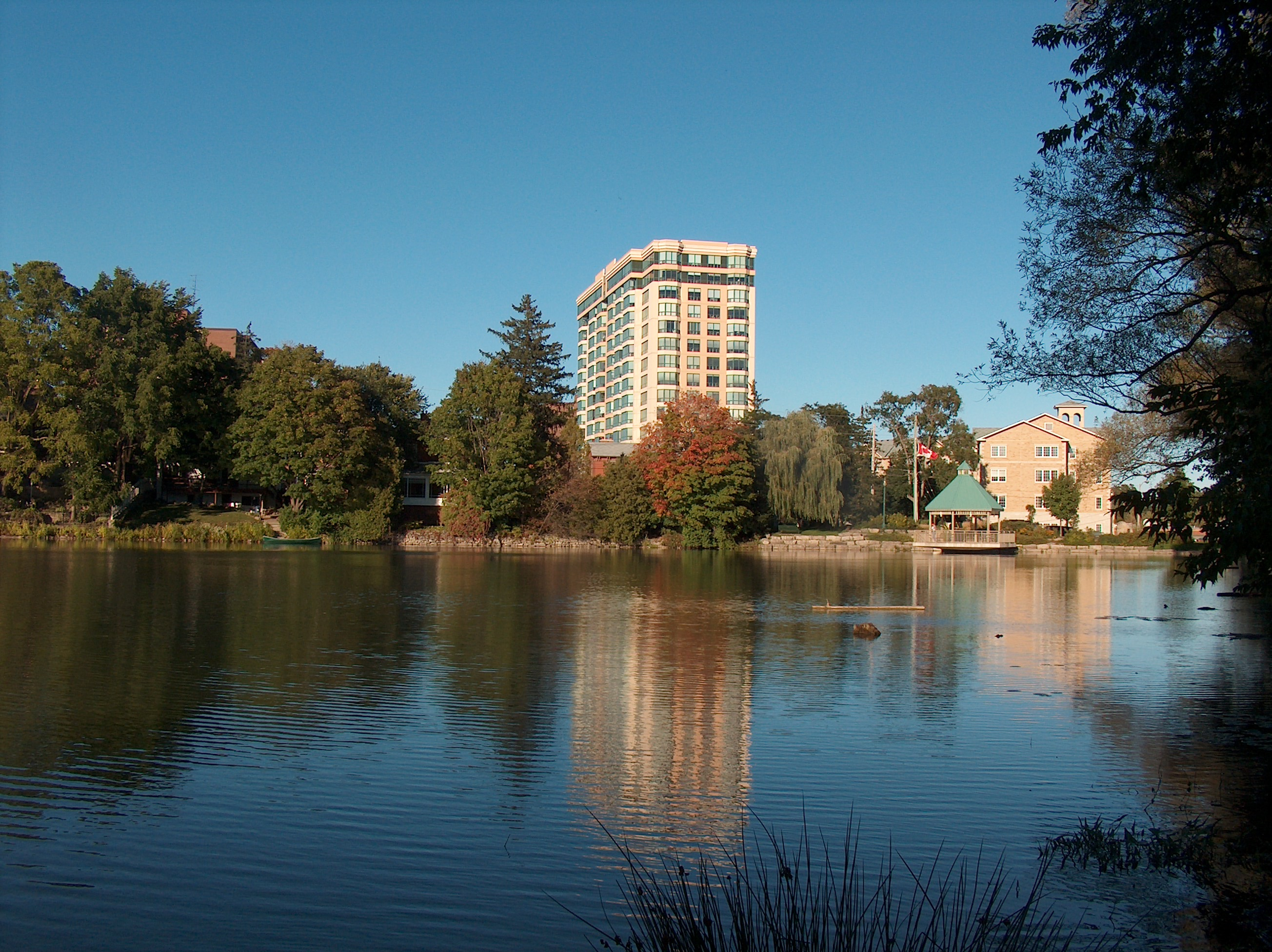
- Mill Pond, Milton, Ontario

- Location of Mill Pond in Ontario Mill Pond (Canada)
- Location: Milton, Ontario
- Coordinates: 43°30′51″N 79°53′11″W
- Type: reservoir
- Basin countries: Canada

Mill Pond is a manmade freshwater reservoir in downtown Milton, Ontario, Canada.

The pond is located on the main street of downtown Milton, a suburban town north of Lake Ontario in the Regional Municipality of Halton. Halton is the westernmost region of Greater Toronto Area bordering Niagara escapement to the west.

The pond powered a gristmill for almost a century, within which time a pioneering settlement grew up to be the town of Milton around the pond and the mill.

== History ==
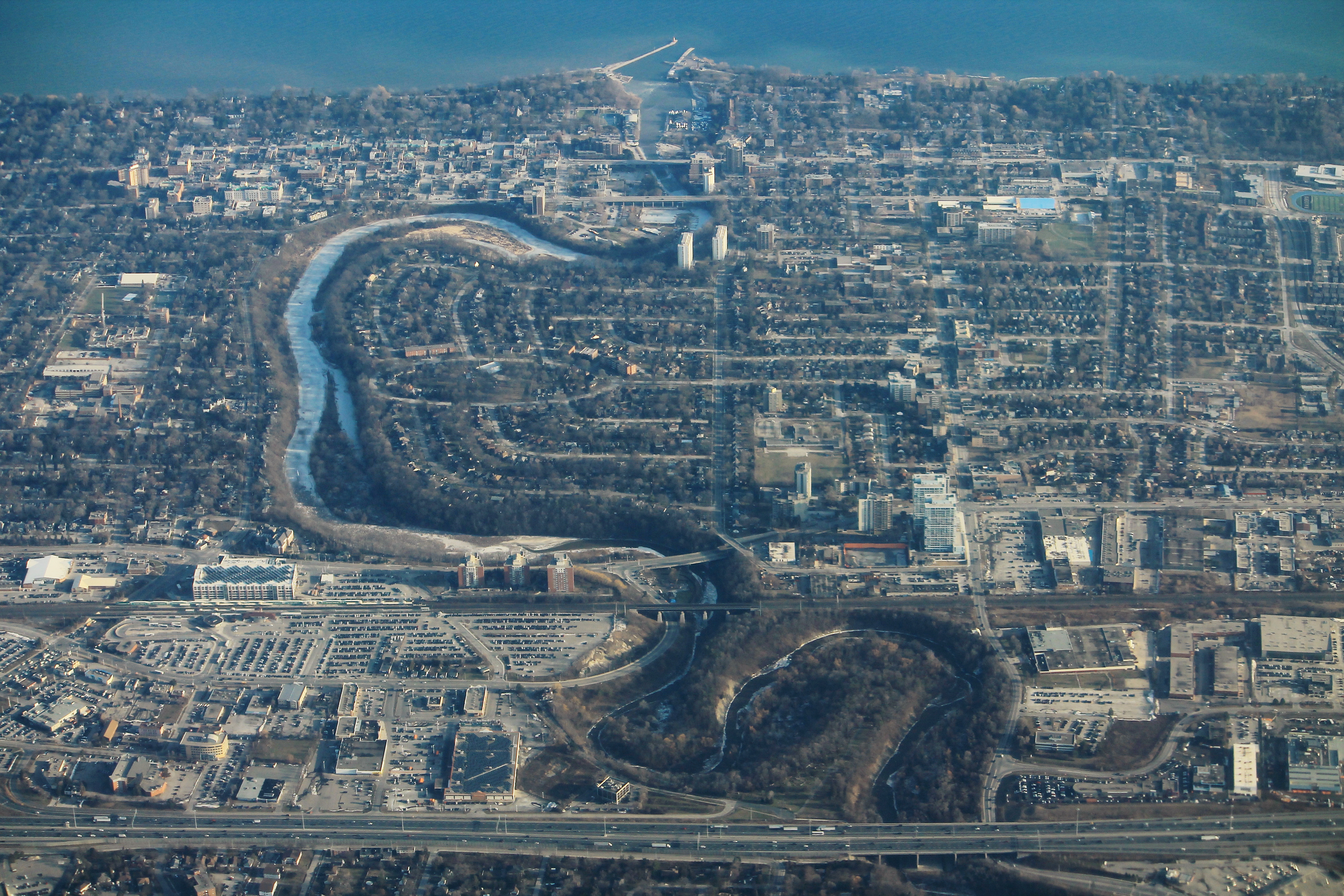
Oakville Sixteen Mile Creek Aerial

The town and the Mill Pond share the same origin in the history. The 16-mile creek flowing right in the middle of the town was dammed to create the pond to power gristmill by the town’s pioneering entrepreneur and founder Jasper Martin in 1820-1822.

The original settlement in 1837 with a population of 100 people became a fully incorporated town in 1857. It was named after the English Poet John Milton. The town of Milton grew around the pond and the mill; according to 2016 census to be 110,128 in population.

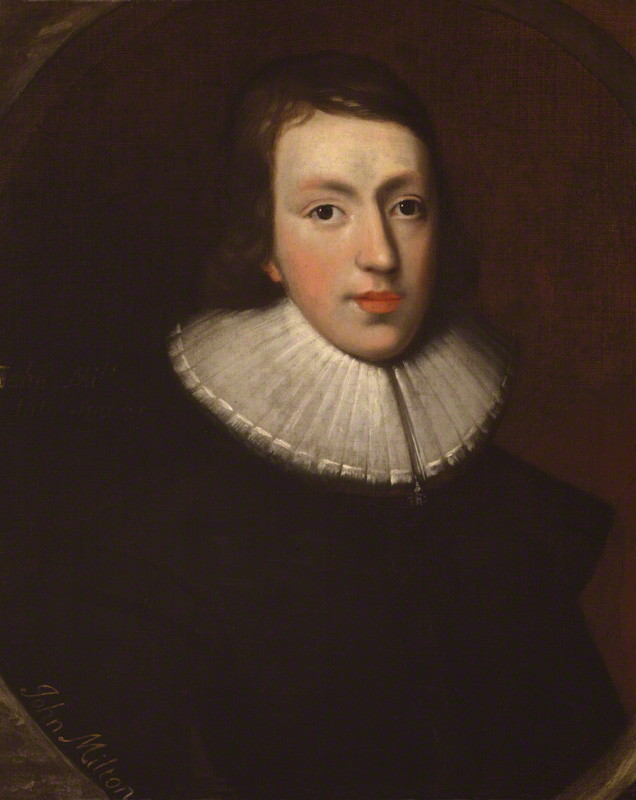
The town, Milton ON was named after English poet John Milton (1608–74)

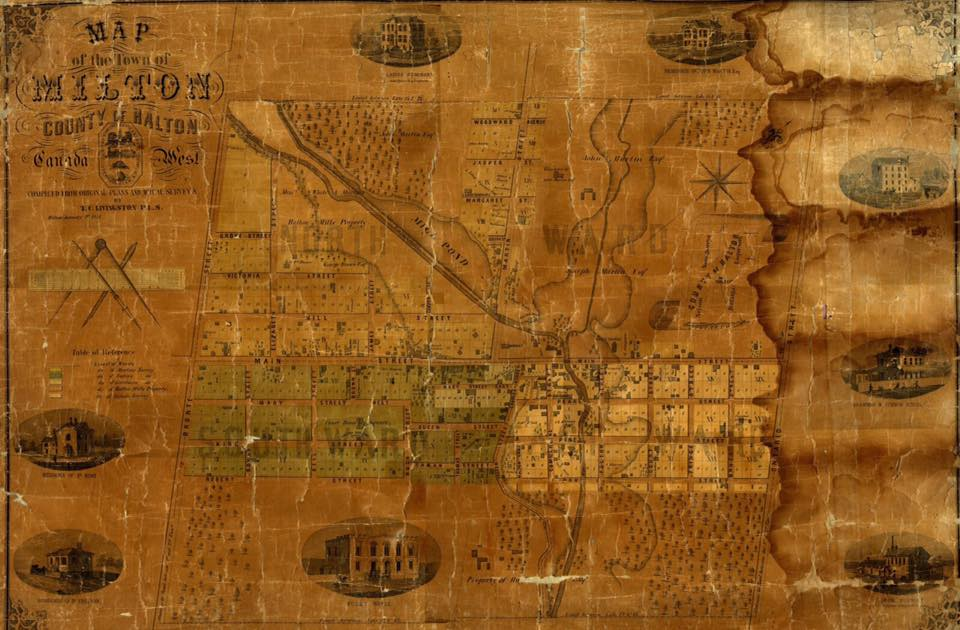
Milton, Ontario in 1858

The current historic old building standing adjacent to the pond is the third mill surviving on the property after two great fires. The first fire in 1855 consumed the stone building that replaced the original frame building. The second fire was just two years after Dr. C.A. Martin, the great-grandson of the mill’s founder, sold the mill to Robin Hood Flour Mills in 1961. The fire consumed the century old grinding mill in a few hours in the morning of February 12, 1963. According to Milton Fire Brigade, they poured 1.5 million gallons of water from the creek, hydrants and from the pond, reducing the water level of the pond by a foot, without being able to save the third building constructed in the property. This fire destroyed the original water-wheel that was used to power the flour grinding equipment until 1962. Housed at the back of the building, the wheel was operated by water from the millpond and creek, and drove the assembly of belts and pulleys to operate the entire mill.

=== 1967 Dominion Centennial project ===
In conjunction with the yearlong Canadian Centennial celebrations held in 1967 to celebrate the 100th anniversary of Canadian Confederation, the town of Milton decided to redesign the Mill Pond. After the fire, the pond area had been donated to the town by its former owners, Robin Hood Flour Mills for development as parkland. Although the plans by a committee of locals included a proposed 60 ft x 150 ft island with a mini zoo and boat rental service, none of those materialized.

The official opening ceremonies of the Mill Pond took place on June 25, 1967. In May, the pond had been refilled, after extensive dredging resulting extended pond banks, a new drainage system and a unique curving bridge over a waterfall spillway. The clear water was stocked with 2,500 speckled trout for recreational fishing. According to Conservation Halton (2020), subsequent fishing derbies for stocked trout have been organized at the Mill Pond.

=== Rejuvenation project ===
Inside Halton reported in 2017 that the project to rejuvenate the Mill Pond took place in 2000. The aim of the project was to clean the pond from invasive weed Eurasian Watermilfoil and to expand the pond. The centerpiece gazebo, popular wedding photography setting, was built in 2001. In June 2024, a program of improvements was announced including the rehabilitation of structures such as the weir wall and inlet structure and the implementation of erosion protection between the pond and Garden Lane.

== Recreation ==
=== Hiking and bird watching ===
According to AllTrails.com (2020), Mill Pond is a 2.1-kilometer, lightly trafficked loop trail featuring waterfront, flora and fauna and is good for all skill levels. This comprises a network of trails around the mill pond known as the Jaycee Trail, which includes the Miller’s Walk, Livingston Park Trail and a trestle bridge. primarily used for hiking, walking, nature trips, and bird watching. Bird feeding is a popular pastime of the towners that birds get very close to human in the pond.

=== Recreational angling ===
The mill pond and the north arms of Sixteen mile creek was native to northern pikes. During the 1967 Dominion Centennial project, in order to be stocked with trout more than 100 northern pikes were rehomed to Fairy Lake in Acton. With newly expanded pond banks and clear water 2,500 speckled trout were introduced, followed by fishing derbies only to find, later, that the pond does not provide suitable habitat to sustain trout. According to Conservation Halton (2020), recreational fishing opportunities exist throughout the Sixteen Mile Creek watershed. The Mill Pond, provides excellent angling opportunities for a number of panfish and carp.

=== Venue ===
Mill pond and the mill site now provide recreation for all seasons and provide numerous pleasure activities.

It included dredging the entire pond of about 30,000 cubic metres of sediment to eradicate the roots of the invasive weed European milfoil. The weed created an esthetic and ecological mess since the milfoil strangled native plant life, such as bulrushes and lily pads, in the pond. The much-photographed gazebo was built in 2001.
