= Charles Laking =

Canadian World War I soldier and veteran (1899–2005)

- Born: February 21, 1899; Campbellville, Ontario, Canada
- Died: November 26, 2005 (aged 106); Toronto, Ontario, Canada
- Occupations: soldier, businessman

Charles Clarence "Clare" Laking (February 21, 1899 – November 26, 2005) was, at age 106, one of the last surviving Canadian veterans of the First World War. At the time of his death he was believed to have been the last surviving Canadian veteran of the war to have fought on the front lines.

He was born and raised in Campbellville, Ontario, and defied the wishes of his Methodist father when he joined the Canadian field artillery in 1917. He served as a signaller on the front lines in France for two years. He received the French Légion d'honneur and a Golden Jubilee Medal.

After the war, Laking worked in lumber until 1941, when he took over Danforth Wallboard and Insulation Ltd. He ran the company until his retirement in 1965. In his old age, he led an uncommonly active life. He went to every Toronto Maple Leafs game until he was 100, drove until he was 102, and walked a mile a day.

Laking was married for many years to his wife Helen, who died in 1993. They had two children, Keith and Sheila. He died in Toronto at the Sunnybrook Health Sciences Centre at the age of 106. In addition to his son and daughter, Laking was survived by four grandchildren and nine great-grandchildren.
