= Haltonville, Ontario =

Haltonville
- dispersed rural community
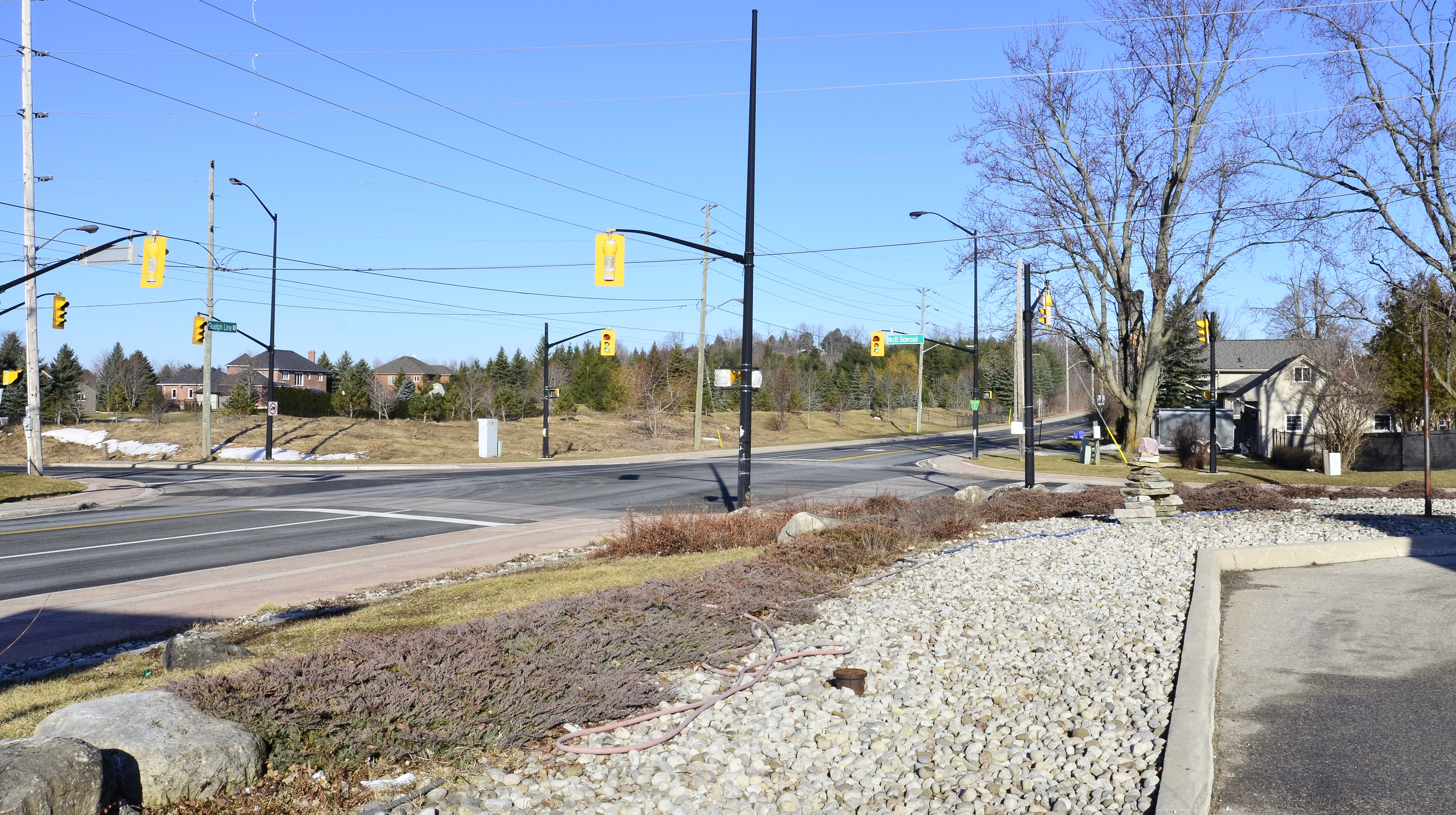
- Looking north on Guelph Line at the "four corners" in Haltonville

- Location of Haltonville Haltonville (Southern Ontario)
- Coordinates: 43°31′33″N 80°02′12″W
- Country: Canada
- Province: Ontario
- Regional municipality: Halton
- Town: Milton
- Time zone: UTC-5 (Eastern (EST))
  - Summer (DST): UTC-4 (EDT)
- GNBC Code: FBLIH

Haltonville is a dispersed rural community in the Town of Milton, Halton Region, Ontario, Canada.

Once a thriving pioneer community, little remains of the original settlement.

== History ==
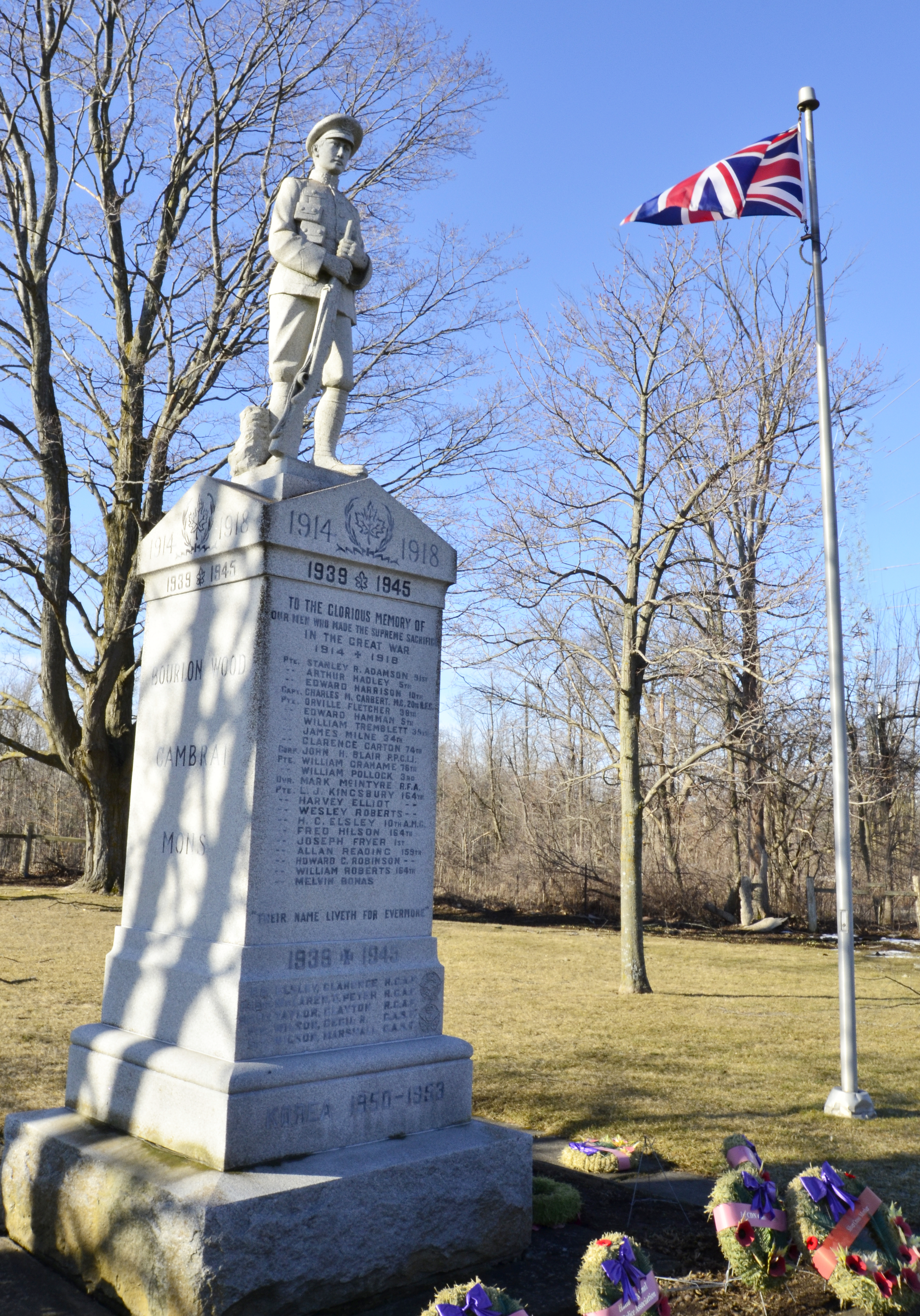
The Haltonville Cenotaph was built in 1921, and is used annually for Remembrance Day ceremonies.

The early settlement was first named "Sodom", while Moffat, located 2.8 km (1.7 mi) west, was named "Gomorrah". This was in reference to the immoral Biblical cities of Sodom and Gomorrah, because between 1850 and 1888, the road between these two settlements "was not safe to travel upon after dark. There were drinking houses on all corners".

The first building in Haltonville was Nassagaweya Presbyterian Church, erected in 1839. The church had 45 members by 1854. A cemetery was established in 1866, and the wood-frame building was replaced by a stone church in 1861. The church was designated a historic property by the Town of Milton in 2004.

Haltonville was settled in 1845 when George Black built a home and shoemaker shop. In 1846, a general store and blacksmith shop were built, and in 1850, the Bee Hive Hotel was built. The first doctor settled in Haltonville in 1852, and in 1859 a second hotel was built. The early settlement also had an apiary, creamery, and money order and savings bank office.

In 1885, the first shorthorn cattle in the Nassagaweya Township were introduced by Haltonville farmer William Dredge Sr. That same year, the settlement had a population of 100.

Haltonville was the birthplace of Lititea Meade, who was one of just 18 female doctors in Ontario when she graduated from medical school in 1891.
