= Mount Nemo Conservation Area =

Conservation area in Burlington, Ontario, Canada

- Interactive map of Mount Nemo Conservation Area
- Location: Burlington, Ontario, Canada
- Coordinates: 43.4235°N 79.8805°W
- Operator: Conservation Halton

The Mount Nemo Conservation Area in Burlington, Ontario is a conservation area owned and operated by Conservation Halton. It is popular with rock climbers in the Greater Toronto Area and the Golden Horseshoe, along with nearby Rattlesnake Point Conservation Area.

== Background ==
The Mount Nemo Conservation area was created after a conservation authority bought 88 acres of land in 1959 to stop a local quarry from expanding. The quarry shut down, and the Mount Nemo Conservation area was created on the disused land. Mount Nemo is part of the Niagara Escarpment UNESCO World Biosphere Reserve. The area is home to Jefferson salamanders, an endangered species.

In 2004, a local quarry applied to expand its property which some argued would damage the conservation area. In response, Canadian singer-songwriter Sarah Harmer formed a non-profit to protest the action and campaign against the quarry's expansion. Since the quarry's initial proposal, campaigners have argued that the conservation area remains under threat. Harmer received the 2025 Juno Humanitarian Award for her work to protect the conservation area.

== Recreation ==
Mount Nemo's five kilometers of hiking trails connect with the Bruce Trail. Pets are allowed. The park also has picnic facilities.

=== Rock climbing ===
The rock type is limestone and most of the routes climbed are sport climbing. The sport climbing begins with a 5.9 but the majority of climbs fall in the 5.10 to 5.12 range. Due to its proximity to major urban areas, Mount Nemo is one of the most popular climbing destinations in Southwestern Ontario.

Conservation Halton has implemented a ban on top rope climbing to protect the ancient cedar trees along the Niagara Escarpment.

=== Caving ===
There are various cave systems running through the rock. Caving is a popular activity at Mount Nemo, with the various caves offering opportunities for enthusiasts from beginner to advanced skill sets.

== Incidents ==
- 23 November 2003 – A woman fell to her death from Mount Nemo. The victim's husband called for help and the death was originally deemed an accident. Later, Milorad Polimac, the victim's husband, was convicted of murder for her homicide.
- 9 September 2013 – A 42-year-old woman died after falling from the top of the cliff taking a selfie.
- 3 July 2020 – A woman fell 40 feet into a crevasse and was trapped. She was rescued the following day when hikers heard her cries for help.
- 30 July 2023 – A man died after falling from a cliff while hiking with friends.
- 28 August 2023 – Hikers came across the body of a woman while hiking in the conservation area. She was found near a popular rock climbing spot.
- 16 September 2024 – A woman was rescued from a cliff face in the Mount Nemo Conservation area after injuring her leg at the Brock Harbor lookout.
- 20 May 2025 – A man died after falling while climbing at Mount Nemo.
