= Boler Mountain =

Mountain in Canada

Coordinates: 42.94°N 81.34°W

- Interactive map of Boler Mountain
- Location: London, Ontario
- Vertical: 63 m (207 ft)
- Top elevation: 328 m (1,076 ft)
- Base elevation: 265 m (869 ft)
- Trails: 16; 5 – Easiest; 5 – More Difficult; 5 – Most Difficult; 1 – Expert
- Lift system: 5 (3 quad chairlifts, 1 magic carpet, 1 tube carpet)
- Terrain parks: 1
- Snowmaking: Yes
- Night skiing: Yes
- Website: www.bolermountain.com

Boler Mountain, previously known as the London Ski Club, is a not for profit recreation club in London, Ontario. The mountain is located in the western suburban neighbourhood of Byron and is used for skiing, snowboarding and snow tubing in the winter and for mountain biking, hiking, zip lining, and beach volleyball in the summer. Despite its name, it is more accurately described as a hill than a mountain. The facility is relatively small but very conveniently located for Londoners. After the 2012 completion of the West Hill expansion, Boler has 3 quad chairlifts, a magic carpet and a tube carpet serving 16 trails.

== History ==
The hill has been in operation since 1946 and is Canada's most southerly ski hill. It began as a single run on the southeasternmost section of the modern hill, accessed by a gravel road from Boler Road, just south of today's Gatineau Road. The small ski club property expanded westward over the years, and the current chalet was built in 2017. The original Boler Road access was closed off around the same time to permit the building of a subdivision, and the entrance moved to the newly extended Griffith Street where it met the original road.

Boler Mountain was served by three T-bar lifts throughout the 1970s and 80s, the westernmost of which was replaced by a quad-chairlift in the early 1990s. The other two T-bar lifts were replaced by a single quad-chairlift in 2003. A fourth T-bar lift had been partially constructed in the early 1980s on a then-newly acquired area of land immediately west of the chalet that came to be known as Hill 2000. The lift never was completed, and was mostly dismantled in 1997. A tubing hill was added at the base of Hill 2000 in January 1998. Work on Hill 2000, later renamed West Hill, progressed slowly from 1978 to final completion in February 2012. Boler officials attribute the delay to the need to wait for donated loads of dirt from construction elsewhere in the city. West Hill includes a quad chairlift and, at 67 metres (220 ft), is now the tallest point in London.

The summer venue was home to the 2001 Canada Summer Games mountain biking event.

Boler Mountain added the Treetop Adventure Park complete with zip lines and aerial challenges in 2013.

It also hosted the Great Northern Concrete Toboggan Race in early 2014.

== Runs ==
There are 16 runs at Boler Mountain.

Ski and Snowboard Trails	Difficulty
By Run	Easiest
Willy's Bowl	Easiest
Easy Street	Easiest
Elbow	Easiest
Apple Jack	Easiest
Kennedy Kruzer	More Difficult
Double Dip	More Difficult
Red's Run	More Difficult
Rub-A-Dub	More Difficult
Spriet Street	More Difficult
Dedication Trail	Most Difficult
Big Dip	Most Difficult
Hill 55	Most Difficult
J.S.	Most Difficult
Rusty's Run	Most Difficult
Wayne's Way	Most Difficult

== Programs ==
In the winter months Boler Mountain hosts a variety of programs. The snow school at Boler Mountain offers both ski and snowboarding lessons that depend on the skill and age of the student. Boler also has a Track 3 program which currently has 250 volunteer instructors serving over 120 skiers who experience disability each season. Boler is also the home of London Ski Club Racing, which offers programs for all ages. In the summer season Boler Mountain hosts a mountain bike camp for children between the ages of 7 and 13. Also, there are weekly bike racing events.

== See also ==
- Beaver Valley Ski Club
- Chicopee Ski Club
- Glen Eden
- Whistler Blackcomb
- Mammoth Mountain
- List of ski areas and resorts in Canada
