= Rattlesnake Point (Canada) =

Conservation area in Milton, Ontario, Canada

Coordinates: 43.4676°N 79.9127°W

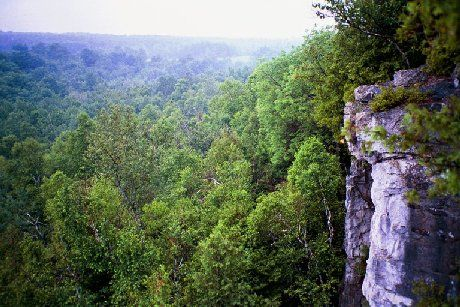
View from the Niagara Escarpment near Rattlesnake Point

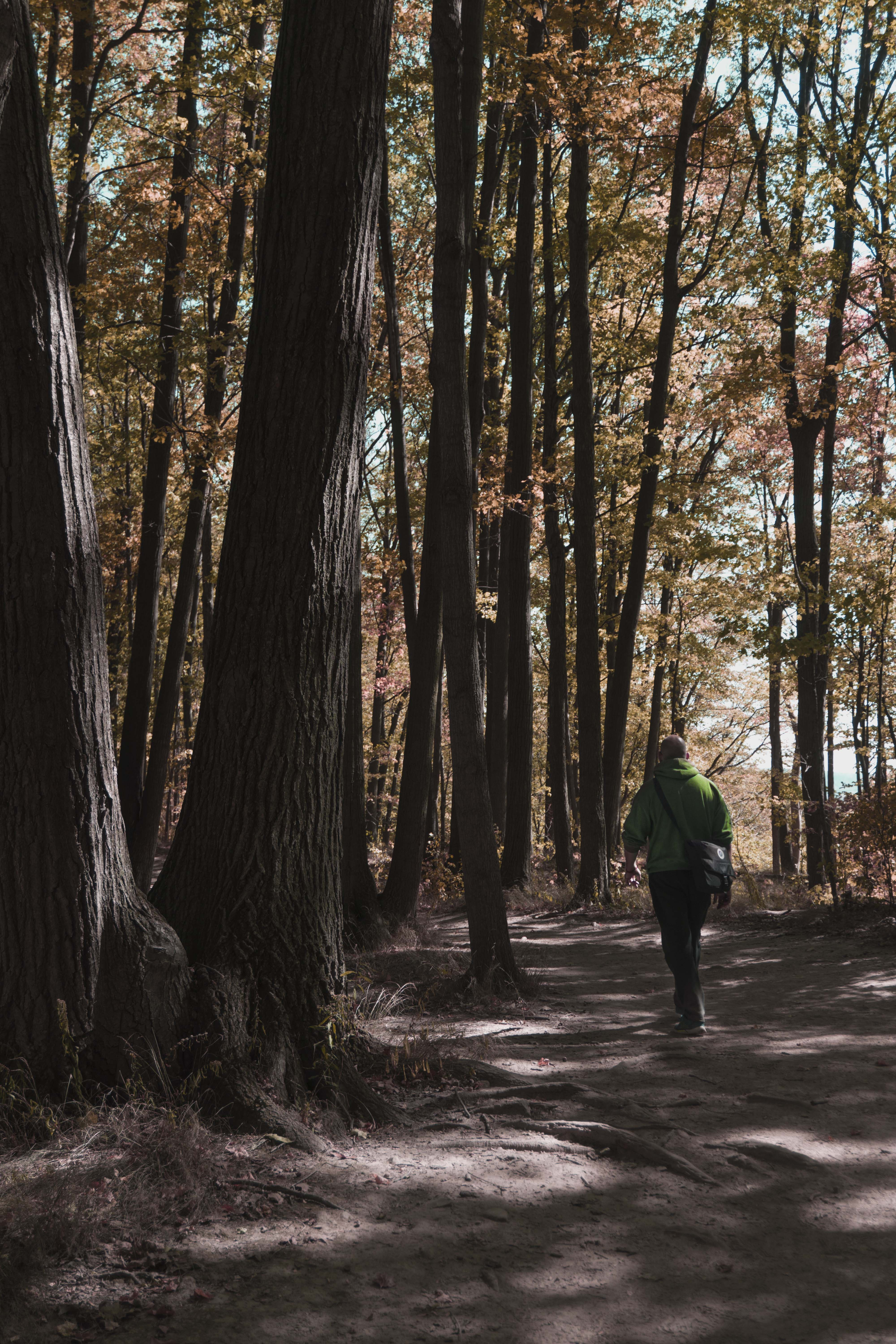
Walking in Rattlesnake Point Conservation Area

Rattlesnake Point is an eco-tourism area located in Milton, Ontario, Canada and is owned and operated by Conservation Halton. Spanning roughly one hundred square kilometres across and near the Niagara Escarpment in Halton Region, the Rattlesnake Point area is home to many golf courses, country markets and equestrian training and boarding facilities. Rattlesnake Point is often visited by cyclists, hikers and climbers due to the array of beautiful caves and cliffs. It is a popular scouting area.

As Southern Ontario urbanizes, new housing developments in Milton have begun to encroach upon Rattlesnake Point. Some of the land previously thought of as unsuitable for development because of its inaccessibility and its status as a United Nations Biosphere-protected area is now seen as prime real estate near the core of one of Canada's most dense urban areas.

Rattlesnake Point receives its name from the snake-like path cut by glaciers along the edges of the Niagara Escarpment, rather than from the Massassauga Rattlesnake.

== History and etymology ==
Although the Conservation Area was established in 1961, the name Rattlesnake's Point in describing the areas has been used as far back as 1857, with long recognition of its scenic potential. Despite the name, there are no actual rattlesnakes native to the area. The name is suggested to have come from the rattlesnake fern that grow in the area.

== Conservation area ==
Limestone cliffs of Rattlesnake Point.

The Rattlesnake Point Conservation Area was established as a conservation area in 1961 by the Halton Region Conservation Authority. It is a popular destination for hikers, backpackers, cyclists, rock climbers and nature-lovers in the Greater Toronto Area along with Mount Nemo Conservation Area. The park's ten kilometres of cliff edge and forest trails connect with the Bruce Trail and Crawford Lake. The conservation area also has facilities for organized and family camping with 18 group campsites. Certain campsites and facilities are closed during the winter from November to April.

=== Trails and access ===
Access to the Bruce Trail at Rattlesnake Point is available at several locations, including Mount Nemo. Other hiking and biking launch spots include Lowville, Kelso and Kilbride. Outdoor enthusiasts can connect to the long Lake Ontario Waterfront Trail. Rattlesnake Point was the location of the 2011 Canadian National Road Race Championships.

=== Rock climbing ===
The limestone cliffs are popular with rock climbers and are fitted with bolts for top-rope anchors. Sport climbing routes are available towards the western edge of the cliffs, having been developed in 2018 as part of the Rattlesnake Bolting Project by members of the Ontario Alliance of Climbers. To protect the ancient cedars that dot the area, there is a ban on slinging trees.
