= Halton Region Museum =

Museum in Canada

The Halton Region Museum was a museum owned by the Regional Municipality of Halton. It now operates as Halton Region Heritage Services. Heritage Services preserves the material and cultural heritage of Halton Region, and acquires and shares knowledge of the region’s historical and natural world. Based at Kelso Conservation Area in Milton, Ontario, Canada, Heritage Services offers seasonal on-site and travelling exhibits and public programming. Heritage Services support the preservation and appreciation of the heritage of Halton Region through partnerships with museums, archives, historical societies, cultural organizations and attractions.

On July 9, 2025, in a closed and now controversial council session with no prior public consultation, Halton Region Council decided to close Heritage Services in December 2025 and deaccession and auction off its 30,000 artifacts, photographs and archival documents. A previously committed 8 million dollars for a new centre was slashed. A petition to reverse this decision has been started on Change.org.

== History ==
The Halton County Museum was established in 1962, after being purchased by the Halton Region Conservation Authority in 1961. It resided on the 200-acre, 125-year old farming property of Scottish settler Adam Alexander.

In 1974, the museum became the responsibility of the Region when the new Regional Municipality of Halton was formed. The Halton Museum Foundation was then established in 1998.

In 2014, Regional Council adopted a new Master Plan for the Museum under which it was transformed into Heritage Services, which supports regional heritage organizations and institutions, and cares for Regionally owned heritage assets.

At the end of 2016, the Halton Region Museum site in the Kelso Conservation Area closed and is no longer open to the public. The facility is still used for staff offices, workshops and collections storage and research services are available by appointment.

A strategic plan followed the closure, which approved the expenditure of $8 million for a new museum space.

=== 2025 closure vote ===
Without community consultation, council voted to cease operations of the program. A museum collection administration study by Lord Cultural Resources about the closure was kept confidential.

In a public statement, Halton Region itself and at least one Halton councillor cited Bill 23, More Homes Built Faster Act, 2022 as part of its justification. The bill, related to affordable housing in the province, did make changes to the Ontario Heritage Act in relation to building designations. A historian quoted in the press noted that it was unrelated to which level of government should provide storage for artifacts or interpret history.

A petition was launched to ask for the reversal of the decision. The petition includes statements from the local organizations said to be taking on the artifacts, stating that they are not prepared to do so. Three heritage experts made deputations to council, December 10, pushing back on the closure. Among them, a professor noted that the Canadian Museums Association guidelines, as well as documents from other professional organizations, require a longer timeline.

It has been noted that many records and artifacts are significant to the entirety of Halton, more than just one modern municipality.

While Oakville and Burlington have civic museums, albeit ones that lack space for additional items, Milton and Halton Hills have no existing facilities.

At a December 10 meeting of Council, Halton Region CAO Andrew Farr extended the deadline to complete the deaccessioning process, longer than the initial January 1, 2026 deadline. At the meeting, Halton Hills Mayor Ann Lawlor and Jane Fogel, a Halton Hills councillor, acknowledged the lack of storage or exhibition facilities in the Town. (Lawlor had stated that "the deaccessioning process will ensure that items of significance to Halton Hills and Esquesing Township will be preserved," in an August 2025 press release.)

One heritage professional quoted by inSauga noted the possibility of a precedent for more municipalities to close their museum facilities. They noted the function is not legislated, but they are maintained out of "a community-level obligation."

== Collection items ==
Select donations to the museum collection were featured by the local and Toronto media, over the years. These include:

- Bell tower of the Bruce Street school, Milton, donated 1975; the bell itself went to the central library
- Tools of Adam Alexander, stone mason who once owned Kelso, donated in 1976 or before

The museum collection had reached 15,000 items by 1976.

=== Historic Alexander family buildings ===
The family's barn, built 1860, was the first building in Halton County to have electricity. Adam Alexander III met Thomas Edison in 1903, and the two discussed electricity. This resulted in Alexander III installing a water wheel to generate power, fifteen years before Ontario Hydro reached the area.
