= Ronald Roberts (ice hockey executive) =

Canadian ice hockey executive and international insurance executive

- Born: June 1, 1925; Campbellville, Ontario, Canada
- Died: July 4, 2012 (aged 87); Frisco, Texas, United States
- Education: University of Michigan
- Occupations: National Hockey League and World Hockey Association executive

Ronald Roberts (June 1, 1925 – July 4, 2012) was a Canadian ice hockey executive and international insurance executive.

A native of Campbellville, Ontario, Roberts served as executive director and general counsel of the World Hockey Players Association, negotiating more than 100 contracts for professional hockey players and coaches in the WHA and, later, the National Hockey League.

Roberts represented WHA players in negotiations for the 1974 Summit Series between Canada and the USSR. He also served on the board of directors of Hockey Canada.

== Early life ==
Roberts was born in Campbellville, Ontario, in 1925 to Charles and Rachel (Sam) Roberts. He went to SS #10 Nassagaweya Public School and later Milton District High School.

Roberts, a World War II veteran who served from 1943 to 1945 with the Royal Canadian Air Force, earned degrees in business administration and law from the University of Michigan.

== Athletic career ==
Roberts played hockey in Milton while in high school, and he played hockey for Milton Merchants. He was selected by the Detroit Red Wings to join their Jr. A farm team, the Galt Red Wings, and later played for the University of Michigan Wolverines hockey team and Scotland’s Dundee Tigers.

== Insurance career ==
Roberts served as chairman of the board, president and other high-profile executive roles with the American Insurance Association, representing 150 member insurance companies, during a 25-year career in the insurance and finance industries in the United States in Illinois and Texas.

Roberts was a member of the Illinois and Chicago Bar Association; American, Texas & Dallas Bar Association and College of the State Bar of Texas.

== Later life ==
Roberts died on July 4, 2012, in Frisco, Texas.

== Awards ==
Roberts was inducted into the Milton Walk of Fame in 2014 posthumously.
