= Brookville, Ontario =

Brookville
- dispersed rural community
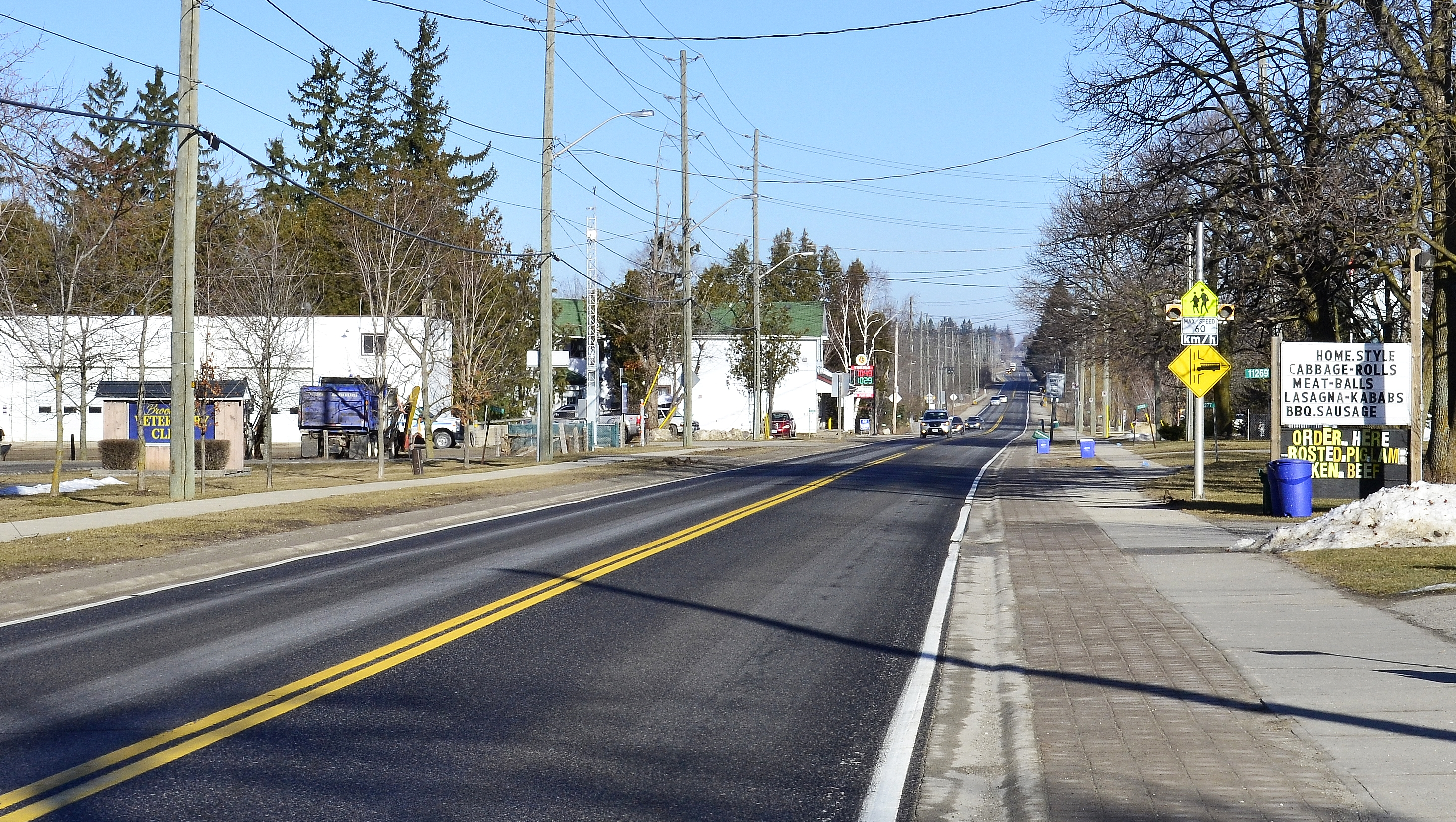
- Looking north on Guelph Line in Brookville

- Location of Brookville Brookville (Southern Ontario)
- Coordinates: 43°31′54″N 80°02′44″W
- Country: Canada
- Province: Ontario
- Regional municipality: Halton
- Town: Milton
- Time zone: UTC-5 (Eastern (EST))
  - Summer (DST): UTC-4 (EDT)
- GNBC Code: FALXN

Brookville is a dispersed rural community in the Town of Milton, Halton Region, Ontario, Canada. The community is located on Mountsberg Creek.

== History ==
The settlement was originally called "Nassagaweya". It is located within the formerly political and now geographic Nassagaweya Township.

In 1831, Elias Easterbrook and his wife Hannah Youart settled in Nassagaweya and built a large house. Their son, Thomas Easterbrook, became the first reeve and treasurer of the township, and the settlement of Nassagaweya was renamed "Easterbrook" in his honour. It was later renamed "Brookville", which still used part of Easterbrook's name.

The Nassagiweya post office operated from 1840 to 1914, and Thomas Easterbrook was postmaster from 1844 to 1868.

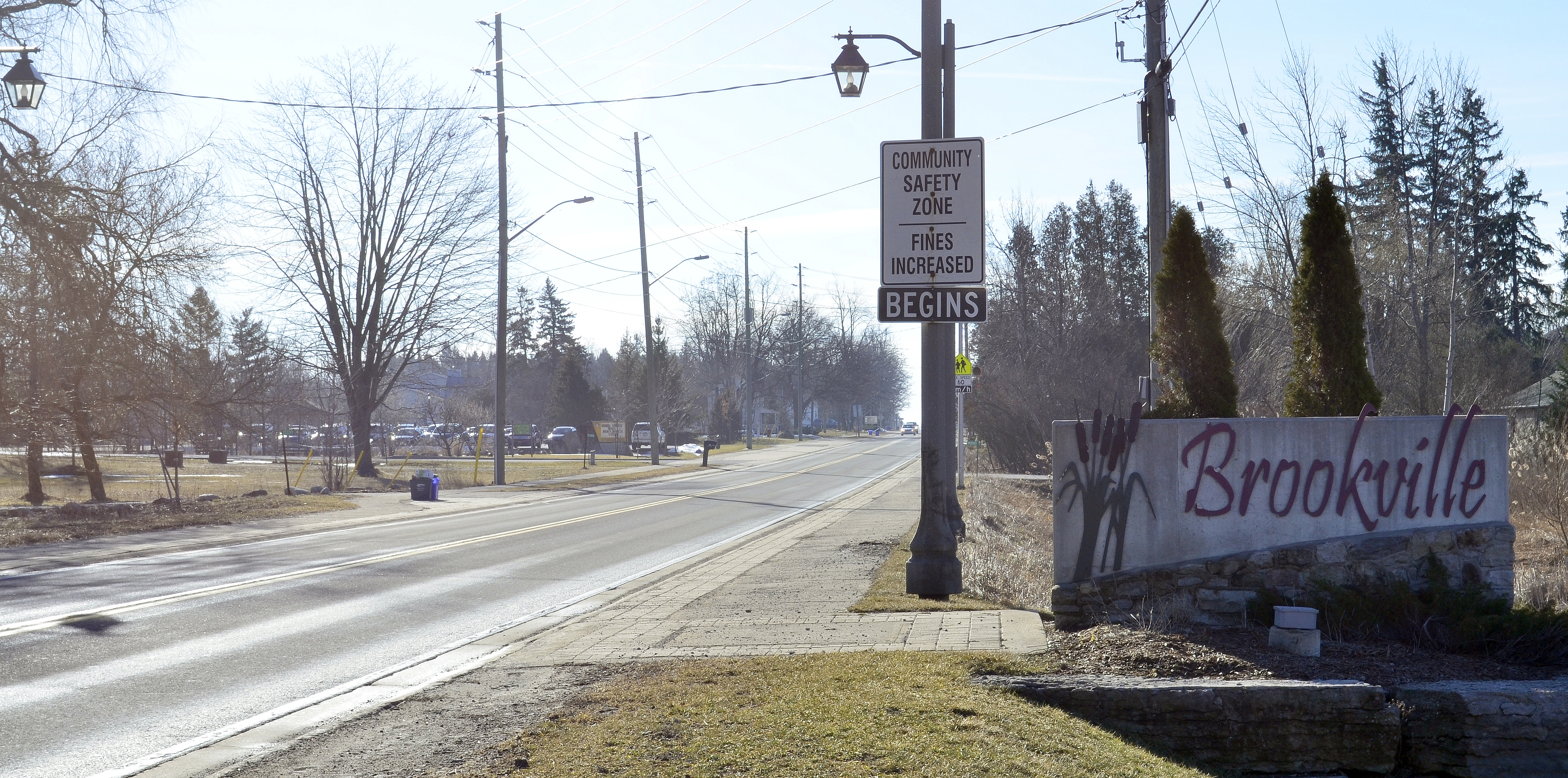
Welcome sign in Brookville

In 1852, Thomas Easterbrook built a store which was also used as a post office. That same year he erected a hotel and wheat storehouse, though the hotel burned shortly after being built.

Around 1865, the Easterbook's stone house was used as a hotel. The early settlement also had tailor, harness shop, cooper, dentist, and veterinarian.

A town hall was built in 1875, incorporating part of the original house of Elias Easterbrook and Hannah Youart. Construction was partly funded by the Sons of Temperance. Dances and parties were held once or twice a month at the Brookville Hall, and it was the centre of the community’s social activity. The town hall was moved and reconstructed in 1987.

The Nassagaweya Fall Show took place annually in Brookville. The Acton Free Press wrote in 1884:

A large number of sturdy yeoman in Nassagaweya with their wives and families might be seen driving into the little place known as Brookville from early in the morning. Their wagons were generally well loaded with farm or dairy produce of excellent quality, to be entered for competition in their own and only fall show.

In 1900, fire destroyed four buildings in Brookville, sparing the general store and town hall.

Brookville Park was built in 1974, and was expanded in 2008 to 3 hectares (7.4 acres). The park includes a play area, multi-use court, playground with covered shelter, paved and lit trails, and a batting/pitching cage.

In 2000, a housing project, Churchhill Estates, began construction in Brookville.
