= Chicopee Ski Club =

Recreation club in Kitchener, Ontario, Canada

Chicopee Ski & Summer Resort
- Location within Southern Ontario
- Location: Kitchener, Ontario, Canada
- Coordinates: 43°25′59″N 80°25′14″W
- Vertical: 61 metres (200 ft)
- Skiable area: 15 hectares (36 acres)
- Trails: 11 4 – Easiest; 4 – More Difficult; 4 – Most Difficult 1 - Terrain Park
- Longest run: 2,000 feet (610 m)
- Lift system: 5 3 chairlifts (1 double, 1 triple, 1 quad) 2 surface lifts (2 magic carpets)
- Snowfall: 133 centimetres (52 in)
- Snowmaking: 100%
- Night skiing: 100%
- Website: Discover Chicopee

Chicopee Ski & Summer Resort (formerly "Chicopee Ski Club") is a winter and summer recreation club in Kitchener, Ontario, Canada, founded December 29, 1934 (91 years ago), as a not-for-profit organisation on 165 acres (0.67 km^{2}).

The Chicopee ski hill has a maximum vertical drop of 200 ft (61 m). There is an average annual snowfall of 133 centimetres (52 in). Winter sports include alpine skiing, snowboarding and a tubing park.

Summer activities include tennis, volleyball, high and low ropes courses, a 30 feet (9.1 m) rock-climbing wall, an 18-hole disc golf course (opened May 2009), mountain bike trails and a BMX course / PINES Bridge Park.

Chicopee also offers extensive summer and winter camp programs, as well as corporate retreats with teambuilding exercises.

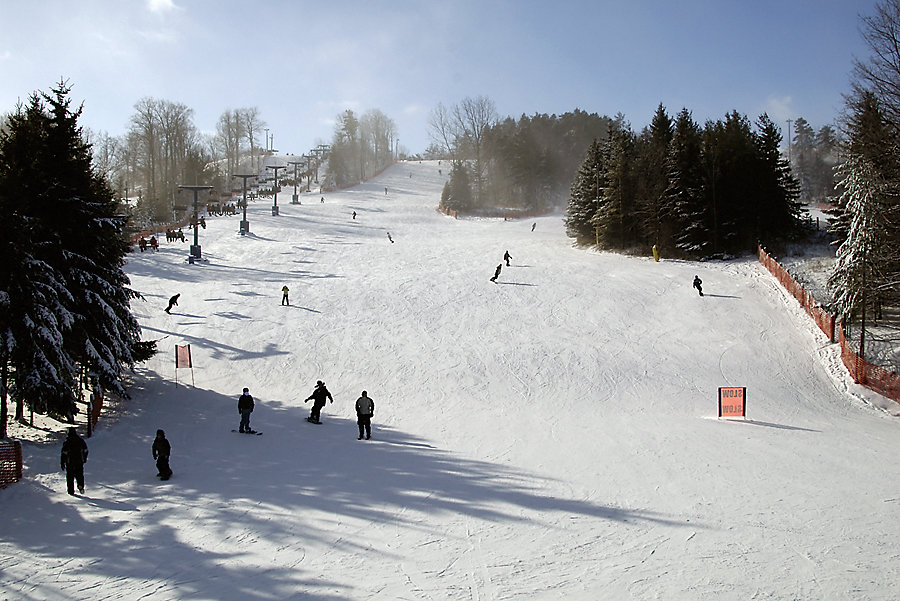
A view from the bottom of North.

== Runs ==
There are 11 runs at Chicopee.

Run Name	Difficulty
Beginner Terrain Park
Little Foot	Easiest
Kids Zone	Easiest
Tenderfoot	Easiest
Easy Rider	More Difficult
North	More Difficult
Chicane	More Difficult
Mic-Mac	More Difficult
Roughshod	Most Difficult
Apple Bowl	Most Difficult
Racer's Alley	Most Difficult
Camel's Hump	Most Difficult
Terrain Park	Most Difficult

== Lifts ==
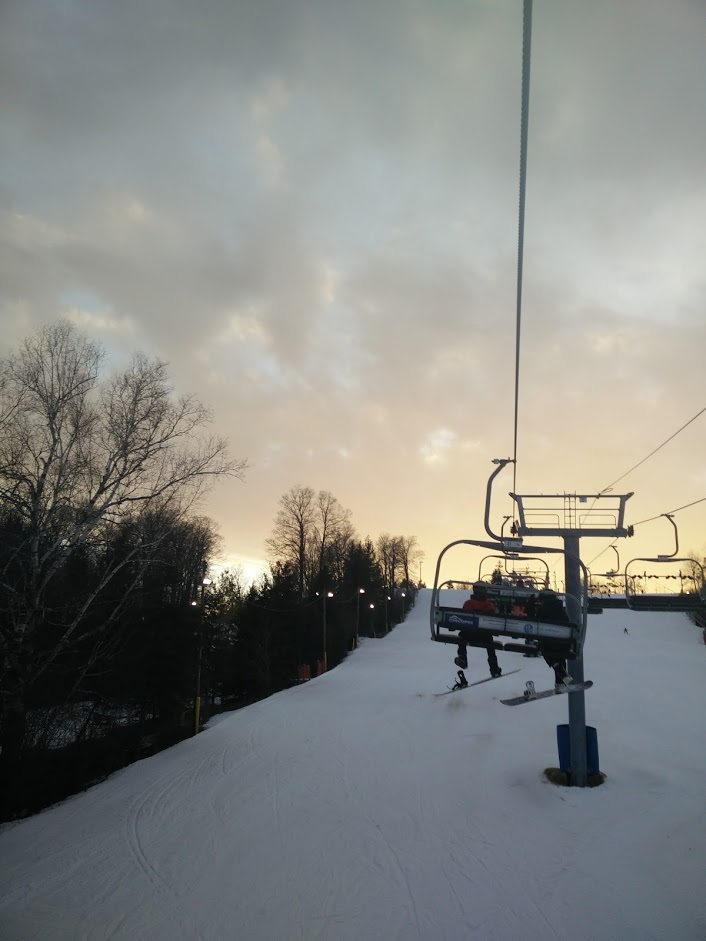
A view on the Chicopee North lift.

Chicopee uses a combination of different lifts, three are regular chairlifts and two magic carpets. The magic carpets are only used on beginner hills.

Lift Name	Length (ft)	Vertical (ft)	Type	Ride Time (min)	Capacity (people/hour)	Manufacturer	Year
North Chair	1089	100	4 Person Fixed Chairlift	2.4	2,400	Leitner-Poma	2011
Apple Bowl	791	177	3 Person Chairlift	2	1,800	Poma	1991
Tenderfoot	699	97	2 Person Chairlift	2	1,200	Poma	1991
Rabbit's Foot Carpet			Magic Carpet
Little Foot Carpet			Magic Carpet

== Programs ==
Chicopee offers a variety of winter programs available to all ages, including Snow School, Downhill Racing, and the Track-3 program. The Chicopee Race program offers the opportunity for anyone, no matter of age, to learn how to race in the Slalom or Giant Slalom disciple. This can be done through weekly programs, Christmas or March Break camps, or lessons.

== Incidents ==
Fifteen-year-old Kevin Loree died in a tobogganing accident in 1977.

On February 17, 2000, skier Paul Thompson was skiing Easy Rider when he lost control and hit a pole. He was taken to St. Mary's hospital where he later died.

On December 29, 2010, approximately 40 people were stranded on the Sugar Bowl lift and were rescued using a rope harness.

On January 2, 2013, an electrical fault in the north chair lift triggered its emergency brake and left approximately 100 people stranded; they were rescued using a rope harness.

== Membership and Attendance ==
Year	Membership	Attendance
2012	5,000	200,000
2009	4,500	275,000
2006	6,000
2001	2,800
1999		116,000

== See also ==
- List of ski areas and resorts in Canada
- Glen Eden (Ski Area) The closest ski hill to Chicopee in Milton, Ontario.
- Beaver Valley Ski Club
- Boler Mountain
