= Hilton Falls Conservation Area =

Conservation area in Milton, Ontario, Canada

Coordinates: 43°30′25″N 79°58′55″W

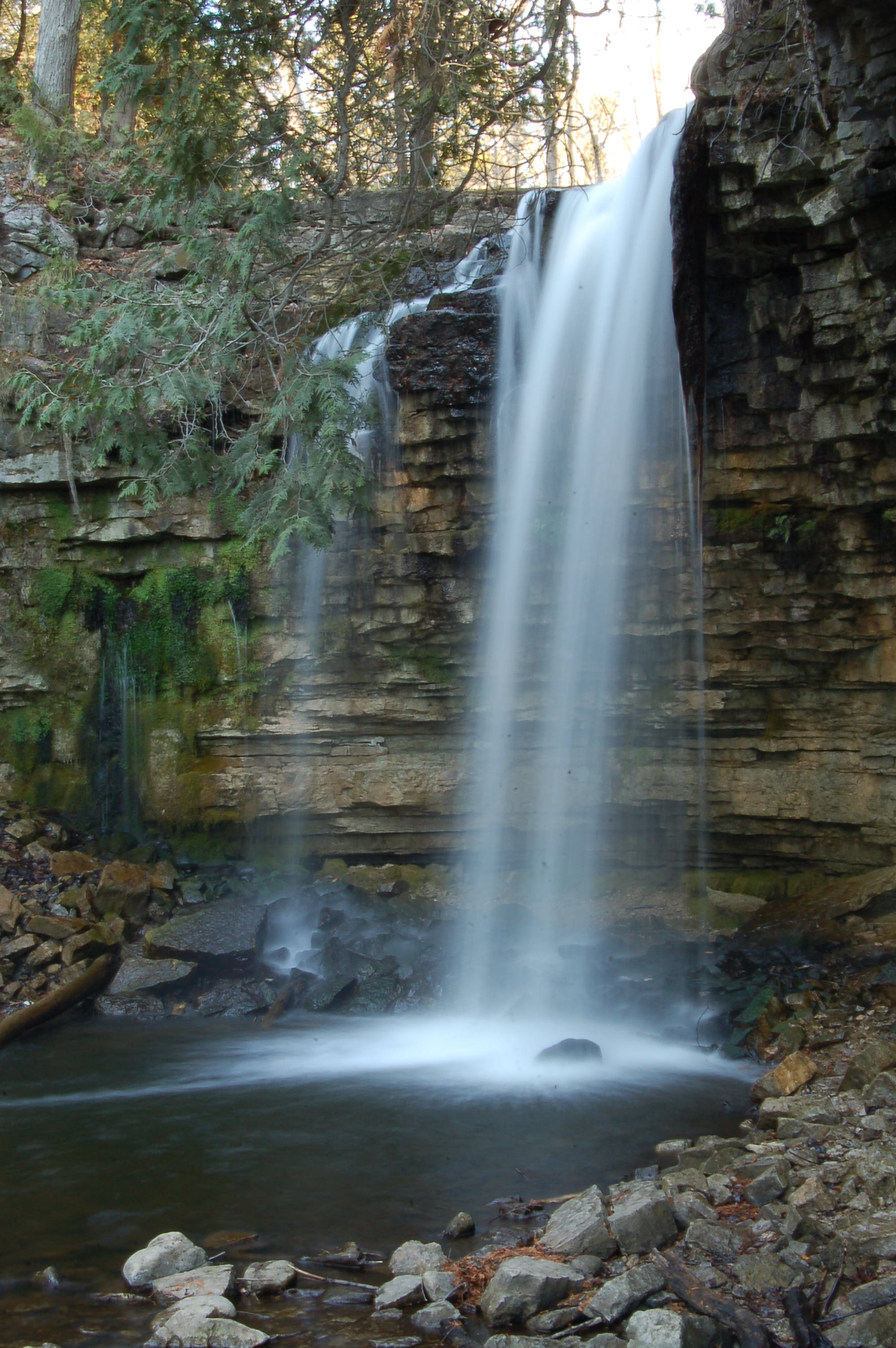
Hilton Falls.

Hilton Falls Conservation Area located in Campbellville, Ontario on the Niagara Escarpment is a conservation area known for its ten-metre waterfall, hiking trails and small glacial pothole. It constitutes 645 hectares (1,590 acres) and offers mountain biking as well as cross-country skiing. It is owned and operated by Conservation Halton. The Bruce Trail runs through the area.
