= Ronald Roberts (veterinary surgeon) =

Scottish veterinary pathologist (1941–2024)

- Born: 28 March 1941; Liverpool, England
- Died: 3 August 2024 (aged 83)
- Education: University of Glasgow

Ronald John Roberts (28 March 1941 – 3 August 2024) was a Scottish veterinary pathologist who pioneered the study of fish diseases. He was Foundation President of the World Association for Aquatic Animal Medicine 2010/11.

== Biography ==
Roberts was born on 28 March 1941 in an air raid shelter at the height of the blitz, in Liverpool, where his father was stationed. He was the eldest son of Ronald George Roberts and his wife Marjorie Kneale. Shortly after the end of the war the family moved to Campbeltown on the west coast of Scotland where he was brought up in the Custom House residence.

He was educated at Dalintober Primary School and Campbeltown Grammar School and went on to the University of Glasgow where he graduated BVMS in 1964 and PhD in 1968.

In 1964 he married Helen, daughter of Gordon Gregor Macgregor, and they had two sons, Gavin and Calum Roberts.

Roberts died on 3 August 2024, at the age of 83.

== Career ==
After a year in general practice he became a member of staff of the Glasgow Veterinary School. While training as a general comparative pathologist, including spells in the Medical School of the University, he commenced his work on the pathogenesis of disease in teleost fish.

He also began a major programme of clinical diagnostic work for the new salmon, trout and turbot farming industries which were developing at the time and in 1971 the Nuffield Foundation awarded him a major Research Programme Grant to develop the role of veterinary medicine in this developing field. Space constraints at Glasgow led to the transfer of the programme to the University of Stirling, nearby, under the guidance of an Academic Advisory Committee chaired by Sir William Weipers, Dean of the Glasgow School. Here the world's first Master's degree training courses in Aquatic Veterinary Studies were created. Over the next 25 years a pioneering international reputation was established in relation to tropical and temperate aquaculture such that the Institute of Aquaculture at Stirling became the largest such Institute in the world.

Between 1982 and 1985 Roberts was seconded to the UN to lead an International Mission to investigate a pandemic of a lethal disease in wild and rice field fishes. The condition was widely believed to be associated with the new technologies for production of the short straw rice varieties which had transformed food supply in much of Asia. It was demonstrated conclusively, however, that pesticide usage was not a factor and the condition was due to a new mutant aquatic fungus, Aphanomyces invadans. Roberts was nominated for both the Japan Prize and the King Baodouin Prize for this work. He was also invested Commander of the Order of the Crown of Thailand (CCT) by HM King Bhumibol Adulyadej of Thailand. In 1978 he was elected Fellow of the Royal Society of Edinburgh. His proposers were Professor RMS Smellie, Sir William Weipers, Sir Cyril Lucas and Sir William MacGregor Henderson.

He served as a member of the World Bank Review of Agricultural Research in India in 1989, a member of the OECD Review of Biotechnology Agriculture and Food in 1992; and a member of the Cabinet Office Agricultural Scientific Restructuring Committee in 1991.

On retirement to Kintyre, on health grounds in 1996, he completed the fourth edition of his standard text Fish Pathology. He remained involved in fish disease research with the University of Idaho; Roslin Institute and commercial companies. He also served on Committees of the European Food Safety Authority and the Scottish University Funding Council.

In 2000 he collaborated with Sir Paul McCartney and a few of his friends in the establishment of a Memorial Garden to Lady Linda McCartney in Campbeltown and was closely involved in local charities. He also planted 200,000 native hardwood trees on his family land in Argyll in an attempt to offset his career international flight CO_{2} deficit.

== Awards and honours ==
As well as appointment as Commander of the Crown of Thailand, he was awarded the Dalrymple Champneys Cup and Medal by the British Veterinary Association, the Fellowship of the Royal College of Veterinary Surgeons, the Foundation Fellowship of the World Aquatic Veterinary Association and the Buckland Medal of the Buckland Foundation. He was Weipers Lecturer of the University of Glasgow in 2007.
