= Mountsberg Conservation Area =

Conservation area in Ontario, Canada

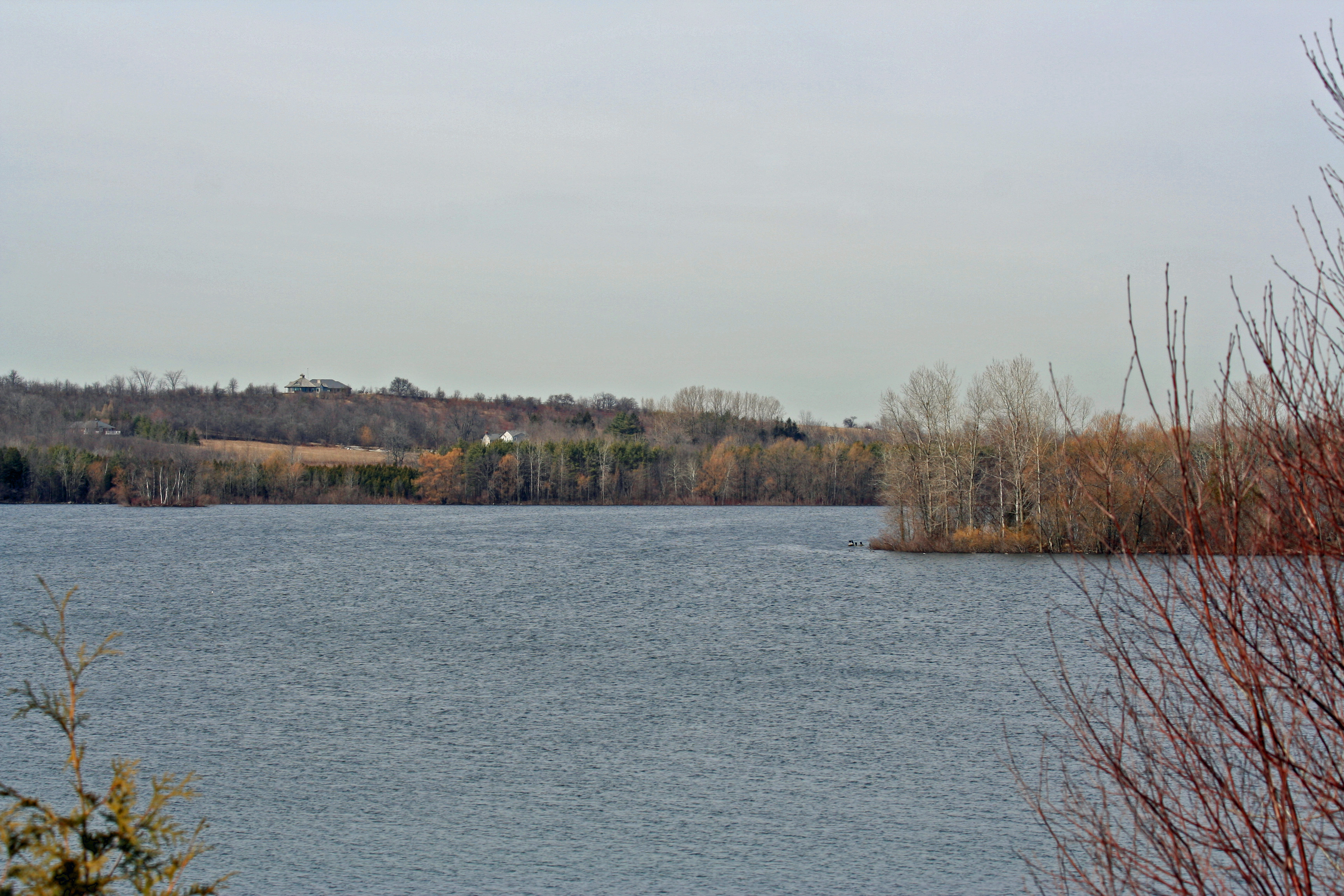

- Location within Southern Ontario
- Interactive map of Mountsberg Conservation Area
- Location: Hamilton, Puslinch, Milton, in Ontario, Canada
- Coordinates: 43°27′35″N 80°01′49″W
- Operator: Conservation Halton
- Website: www.conservationhalton.ca/parks/mountsberg/

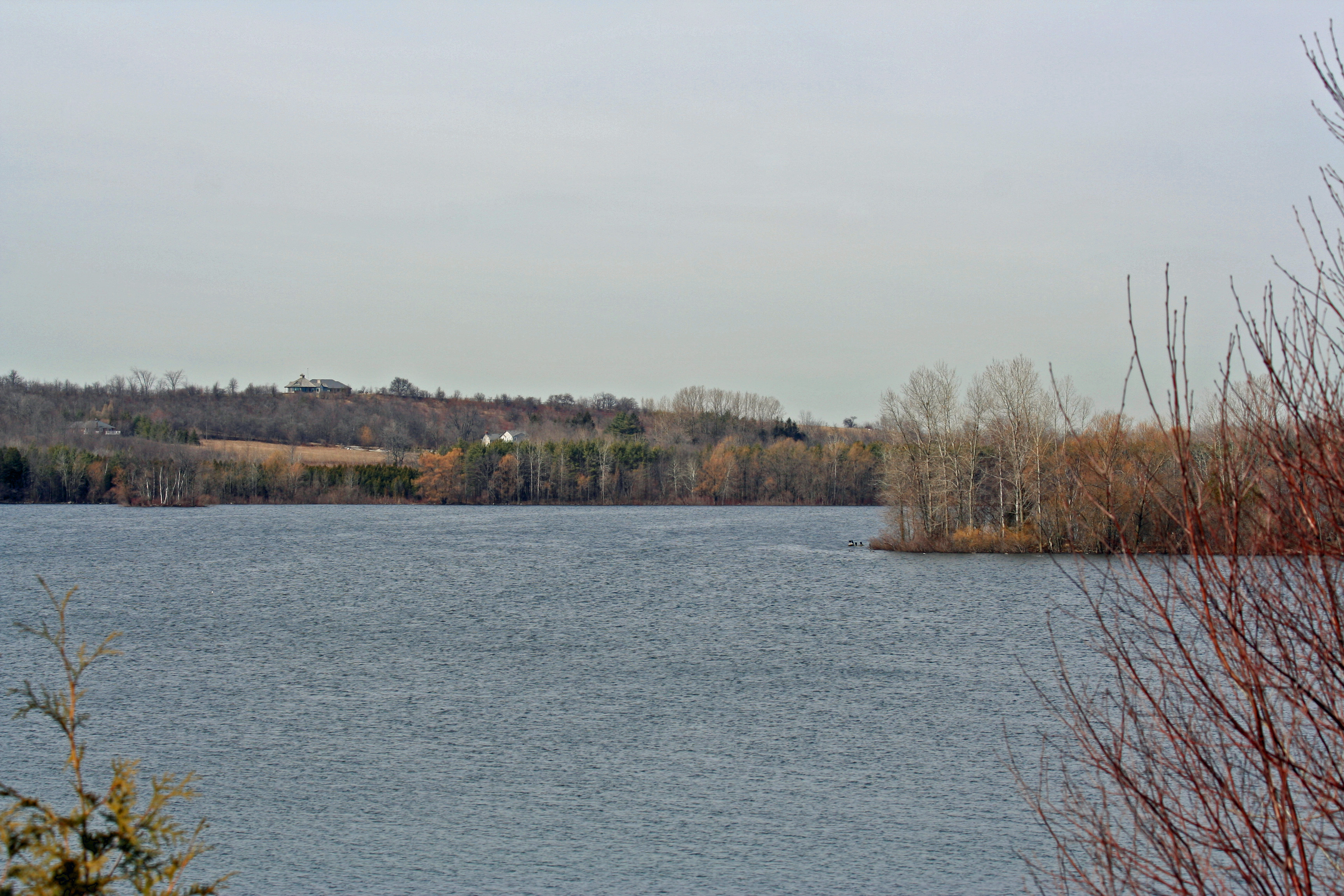

Mountsberg Conservation Area is a conservation area in the city of Hamilton, the township municipality of Puslinch, and the town of Milton, in Ontario, Canada, on the Mountsberg Reservoir. It is widely known for its Raptor Centre. It is owned and operated by Conservation Halton. Kept there are variety of birds, buffalo, horses, and many other animals. Schools can go to the Conservation area to have lessons about birds. The Canadian Pacific Railway's Galt Subdivision crosses through the Mountsberg Reservoir.

The park is named for the village of Mountsberg.
