= Speckled Trout Creek (Greater Sudbury) =

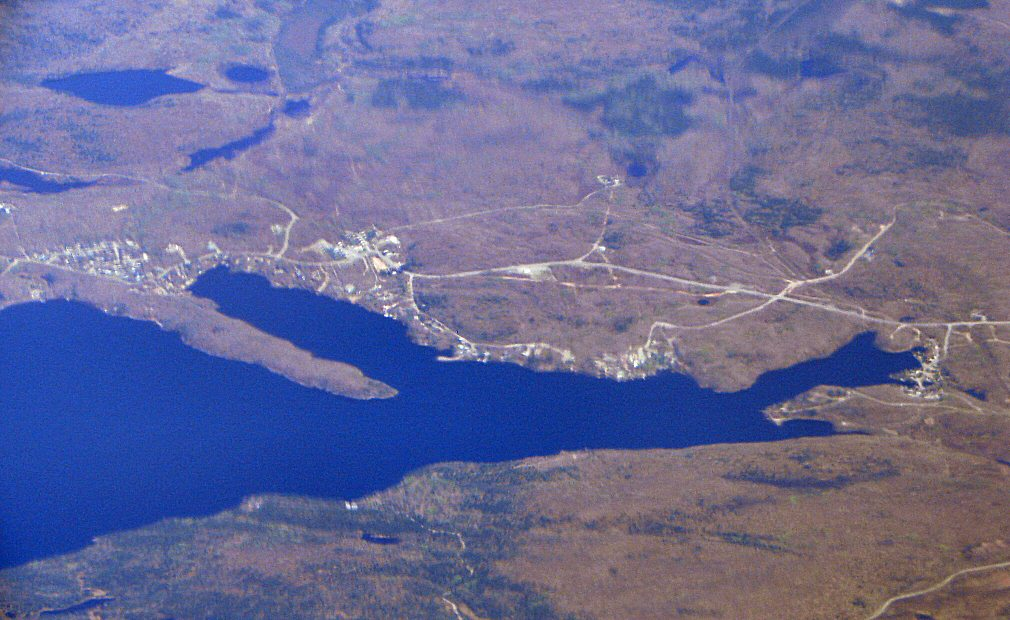
- Aerial view of the mouth of Speckled Trout Creek at lower far right

- Location of the mouth of Speckled Trout Creek in Ontario

Location
- Country: Canada
- Province: Ontario
- Region: Northeastern Ontario
- Municipality: Greater Sudbury

Physical characteristics
- Source: Unnamed lake
  - coordinates: 46°38′42″N 80°46′40″W
  - elevation: 276 m (906 ft)
- Mouth: Lake Wanapitei
  - coordinates: 46°39′16″N 80°46′12″W
  - elevation: 267 m (876 ft)

Basin features
- River system: Great Lakes Basin
- Tributaries
  - left: Massey Creek

Speckled Trout Creek is a creek in geographic Maclennan Township, Greater Sudbury in Northeastern Ontario, Canada. It is in the Great Lakes Basin, empties into Lake Wanapitei, and is located just north of Sudbury Airport.

Speckled Trout Creek begins at an unnamed lake and heads north. It takes in the left tributary Massey Creek, flows under the former railbed of the Canadian National Railways then the present West Bay Road, passes by the settlement of Boland's Bay, and reaches its mouth at Lake Wanapitei. Lake Wanapitei flows via the Wanapitei River and the French River to Georgian Bay on Lake Huron.

== See also ==
- List of rivers of Ontario
