= Sixteen Mile Creek (Niagara Region) =

- Location of the mouth of Sixteen Mile Creek in southern Ontario

Location
- Country: Canada
- Province: Ontario
- Region: Southern Ontario
- Regional Municipality: Niagara
- Municipalities: Lincoln; Pelham; West Lincoln

Physical characteristics
- Source: Field
  - location: West Lincoln
  - coordinates: 43°03′41″N 79°31′26″W
  - elevation: 182 m (597 ft)
- Mouth: Sixteen Mile Creek Pond at Lake Ontario
  - location: Lincoln
  - coordinates: 43°09′34″N 79°20′02″W
  - elevation: 74 m (243 ft)

Basin features
- River system: Great Lakes Basin

Sixteen Mile Creek is a stream in the municipalities of Lincoln, Pelham and West Lincoln, Regional Municipality of Niagara in Southern Ontario, Canada. It is part of the Great Lakes Basin and flows from the top of the Niagara Escarpment to Sixteen Mile Pond on Lake Ontario. The stream falls within the remit of the Niagara Peninsula Conservation Authority, whose 2012 watershed report card gave the stream watershed grades of D for both water quality and forest cover.

== Sources ==
- Map 3 (PDF) (Map). 1 : 700,000. Official road map of Ontario. Ministry of Transportation of Ontario. 2010-01-01.
- Restructured municipalities - Ontario map #6 (Map). Restructuring Maps of Ontario. Ontario Ministry of Municipal Affairs and Housing. 2006.
- "Drainage basins and subwatersheds" (PDF). 2012 Watershed Report Card. Niagara Peninsula Conservation Authority. 2013. Archived from the original (PDF) on 2014-04-16.
