= Sixteenmile Creek (Ontario) =

- Location of the mouth of Sixteenmile Creek in southern Ontario

Location
- Country: Canada
- Province: Ontario
- Region: Southwestern Ontario
- County: Elgin
- Municipality: West Elgin

Physical characteristics
- Source: field
  - coordinates: 42°35′14″N 81°41′05″W
  - elevation: 215 m (705 ft)
- Mouth: Lake Erie
  - coordinates: 42°30′22″N 81°36′46″W
  - elevation: 173 m (568 ft)

Basin features
- River system: Great Lakes Basin

Sixteenmile Creek is a stream in the municipality of West Elgin, Elgin County in Southwestern Ontario, Canada. It is part of the Great Lakes Basin, and flows from a point just south of Ontario Highway 401 east of exit 129 through the community of Rodney, past the community of New Glasgow, to its mouth at the community of Port Glasgow on Lake Erie.

== Sources ==
- Map 1 (PDF) (Map). 1 : 700,000. Official road map of Ontario. Ministry of Transportation of Ontario. 2010-01-01.
- Restructured municipalities - Ontario map #6 (Map). Restructuring Maps of Ontario. Ontario Ministry of Municipal Affairs and Housing. 2006. Archived from the original on 2021-02-24.
