= Kelso Conservation Area =

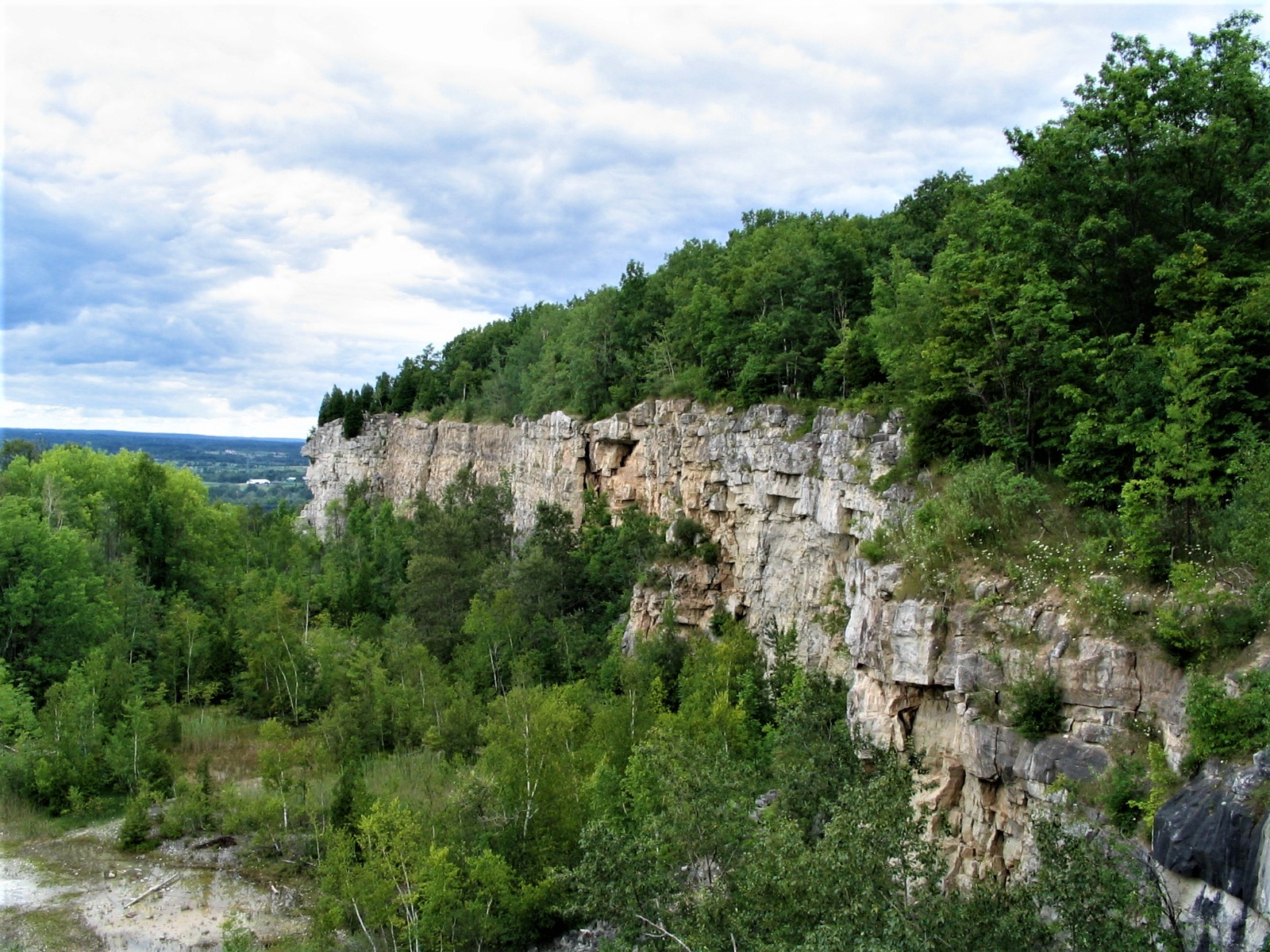
Niagara Escarpment in Kelso Conservation Area in August 2004

Kelso Conservation Area is located near Milton, Ontario on the Niagara Escarpment and is owned and operated by Conservation Halton. This park has an area of 3.97 square kilometres and contains Lake Kelso which was built for flood control of Sixteen Mile Creek and has a sandy beach for swimmers in the summer with a food concession and board walk along the lake to the Boat Rental shop which offers the rentals of canoes, kayaks, paddle boards, paddle boats and is also open to any non-motorized watercraft. The Park also offers 20 campsites, 18 reserve-able picnic sites, and two camping/picnic mixed sites. Glen Eden Ski & Snowboard Centre is located in the park and offers downhill skiing and snowboarding during the winter months. In addition, the Halton Region Museum is also located on the Kelso grounds. The park also features marked mountain biking and hiking trails.

Lake Kelso also provides a natural, economical and convenient source of very cold water for snow-making for the Glen Eden Ski & Snowboard Centre; negating the need to use water from Halton's main line utility service.

== Lake Kelso ==
Lake Kelso
- Location within Southern Ontario Location within Ontario
- Location: Milton, Ontario
- Coordinates: 43°30′40″N 79°56′45″W
- Type: reservoir
- Primary inflows: Sixteen Mile Creek
- Primary outflows: Sixteen Mile Creek
- Basin countries: Canada

Lake Kelso is a man-made reservoir which was created to control the flooding of Sixteen Mile Creek in Milton, Ontario. It is found within Kelso Conservation Area and is maintained by Conservation Halton.

One of the founders of Conservation Halton, Allan Day, recalls that before the reservoir was built, "Milton used to get flooded every spring thaw. Milton's main street would get flooded." It was Day who convinced the previous landowner to sell his property to the Sixteen-Mile Creek Authority in 1961. The authority purchased the land for $40 000 before erecting a $325 000 water control dam a few years later.

== Glen Eden ==
Glen Eden
- Interactive map of Glen Eden
- Location: Milton, Ontario
- Nearest city: Mississauga
- Coordinates: 43°30′18.1″N 79°56′37.2″W
- Vertical: 72 m (236 ft)
- Trails: 15
- Longest run: 1,800 feet (550 m)
- Lift system: 6 total; 3 quad chairs 3 carpets
- Terrain parks: Yes
- Snowmaking: Yes
- Night skiing: Yes
- Website: Glen Eden Ski and Snowboard Center

The Glen Eden ski area is located within the Kelso Conservation Area, with skiing and snowboarding. The ski area is owned and operated by the Halton Region Conservation Authority. The Glen Eden ski area is highly visible from the eastbound lane of Highway 401 near Milton, Ontario.

== See also ==
- Beaver Valley
- Chicopee Ski Club
- Boler Mountain
- List of ski areas and resorts in Canada
