= Conservation Halton =

Canadian conservation authority

Halton Region Conservation Authority (Conservation Halton)
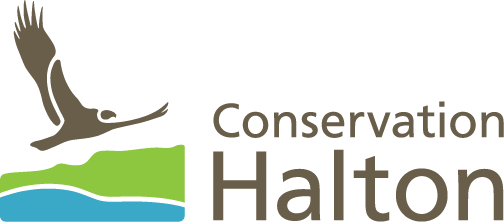
- Abbreviation: HRCA
- Formation: 1956
- Type: Conservation Authority
- Headquarters: Burlington, Ontario
- Coordinates: 43.4238°N 79.9030°W (Head office bldg.)
- Staff: 339 (2006)
- Website: Conservation Halton

Conservation Halton, also known as the Halton Region Conservation Authority, is a conservation authority established under the Conservation Authorities Act of Ontario. It forms a partnership with the Province of Ontario, the Ministry of Natural Resources and the regional municipalities of Halton, Peel, The County of Wellington, and surrounding municipalities. Conservation Halton serves the communities in which it resides in various functions. It provides environmental protection to the large local forest resource and assists in maintaining and improving the health of the watershed's natural environment. This includes the watershed's most significant natural feature, the Niagara Escarpment. Conservation Halton also manages water resources; ensuring the surrounding communities receive clean water and protecting them from flooding. Conservation Halton employs 339 staff (2003) including full-time, part-time and seasonal employees. Its administration office is located in Lowville, a rural village in Burlington, Ontario. In 2004 Conservation Halton was featured as one of Canada's Top 100 Employers in Maclean's magazine for their progressive human resources policies and perks, including free access to local parks for employees and their families.

== History ==
Conservation Halton was formed in 1956 as the Sixteen Mile Conservation Authority followed by the formation of the Twelve Mile Conservation Authority in 1957. In 1963 these conservation authorities amalgamated to form the Halton Region Conservation Authority which later became known as Conservation Halton. It was created based on the watershed of the two creek systems, by representatives from the municipalities of Mississauga, Flamborough (now part of the City of Hamilton, Oakville, Trafalgar Township (now part of Oakville), Burlington, Nelson Township (now part of Burlington), Milton, and Esquesing Township (now Halton Hills.)

== Parks ==
The authority operates seven conservation parks year-round, most with full-time staff. These seven parks are all located in the Halton region. Additionally, Conservation Halton maintains a number of smaller conservation lands with limited staff and facilities, as well as local properties that have no facilities or public access. Because parks are funded on a self-sustaining basis, entrance fees are charged at the staffed parks. All parks except Mountsberg offer connections to the Bruce Trail.

- Crawford Lake Conservation Area
- Glen Eden Ski & Snowboard Centre
- Hilton Falls Conservation Area
- Kelso Conservation Area
- Mount Nemo Conservation Area
- Mountsberg Conservation Area
- Rattlesnake Point Conservation Area
- Robert Edmondson Conservation Area
