= List of ski areas and resorts in Canada =

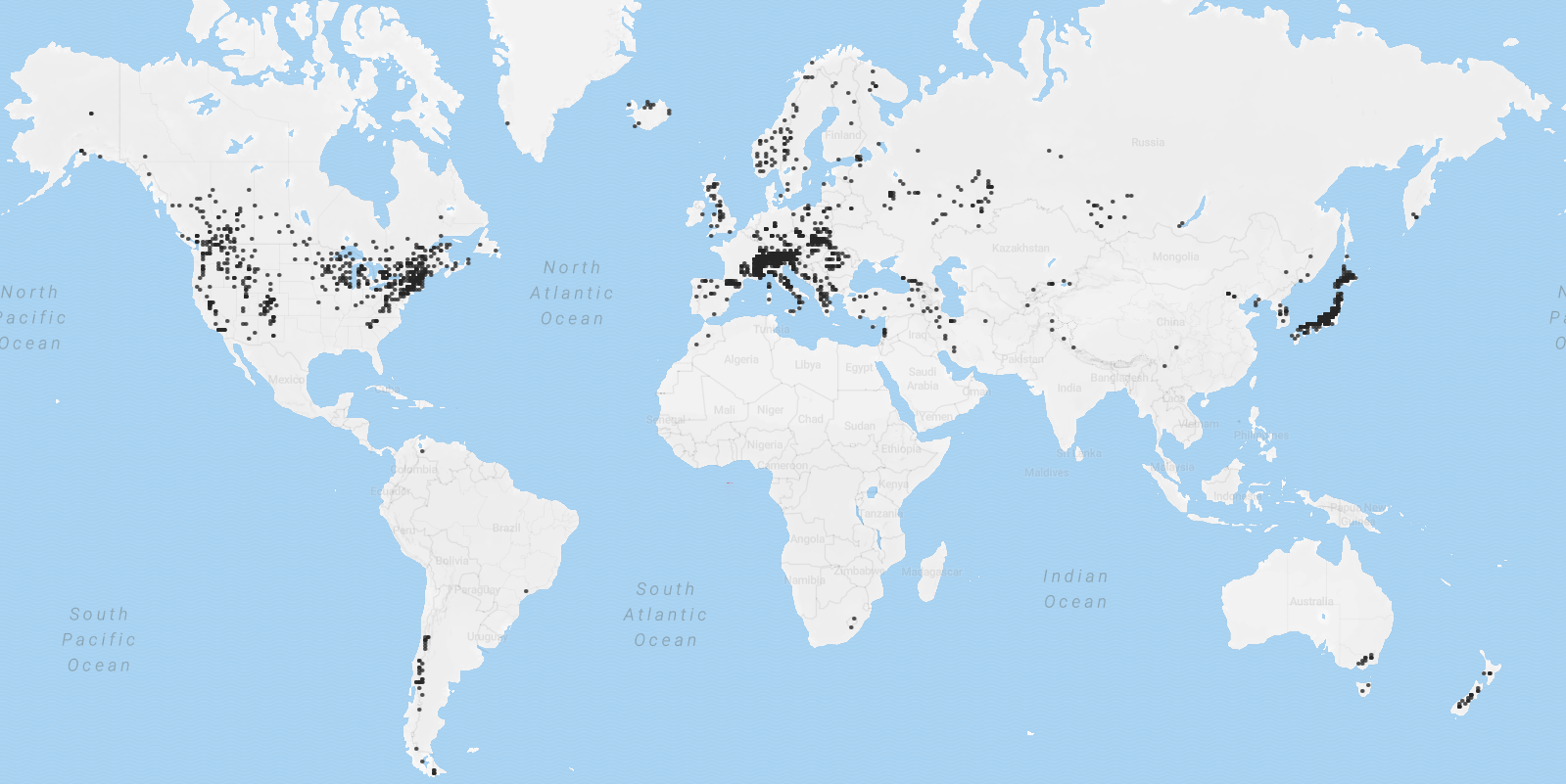
Map of global ski resorts

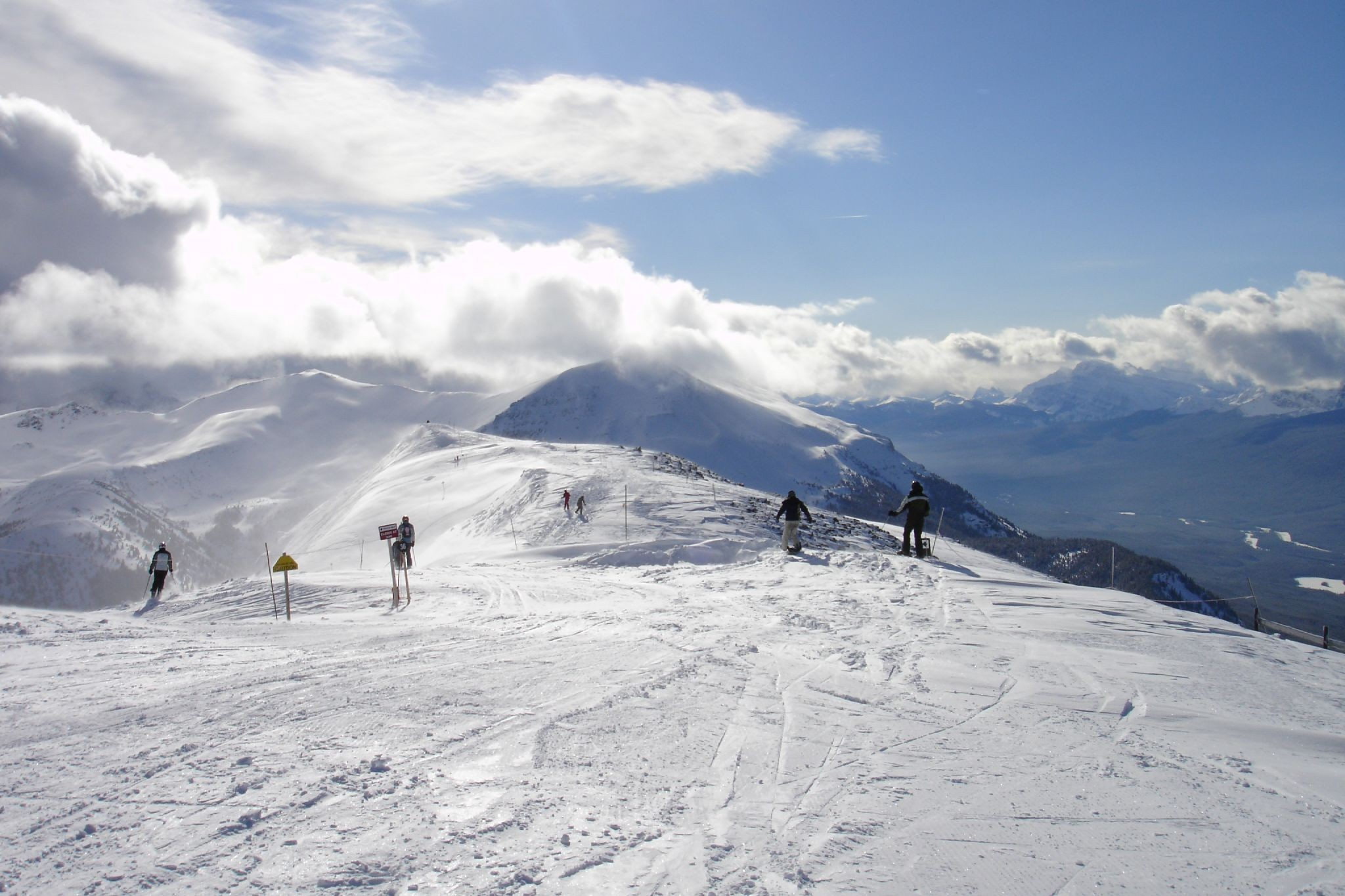
Skiing at Lake Louise in Banff National Park, Alberta

This is a list of ski areas and resorts in Canada.

== Alberta ==
- Banff Sunshine, Banff (Note: Part of the resort is located in British Columbia)
- Canmore Nordic Centre (1988 Winter Olympics Nordic and biathlon events)
- Canyon Ski Area, Red Deer
- Castle Mountain Resort, Pincher Creek
- Eastlink Park, Whitecourt
- Edmonton Ski Club
- Fairview Ski Hill, Fairview
- Hidden Valley Ski Resort, Cypress Hills Interprovincial Park
- Innisfail Ski Hill, Innisfail
- Kinosoo Ridge Ski Resort, Cold Lake
- Lake Louise Mountain Resort, Lake Louise in Banff National Park
- Little Smokey Ski Area, Falher, Alberta
- Marmot Basin, Jasper
- Misery Mountain, Alberta, Peace River
- Mount Norquay ski resort, Banff
- Nakiska (1988 Winter Olympics)
- Nitehawk Ski Area, Grande Prairie
- Rabbit Hill Snow Resort, Edmonton
- Silver Summit, Edson
- Snow Valley Ski Club, city of Edmonton
- Sunridge Ski Area, city of Edmonton
- Tawatinaw Valley Ski Club, Tawatinaw, Alberta
- Valley Ski Club, Alliance, Alberta
- Vista Ridge, Fort McMurray
- Whispering Pines ski resort, Worsley
- WinSport's Canada Olympic Park (1988 Winter Olympics sliding and jumping events)

== British Columbia ==
- Apex Mountain Resort, Penticton
- Bear Mountain Ski Hill, Dawson Creek
- Big Bam Ski Hill, Fort St. John (closed)
- Big White Ski Resort, Kelowna
- Burke Mountain Ski Area, Coquitlam (closed)
- Crystal Mountain, West Kelowna (closed)
- Cypress Mountain, West Vancouver
- Fairmont Hot Springs Resort, Fairmont Hot Springs
- Fernie Alpine Resort, Fernie
- Forbidden Plateau Ski Area, Courtenay-Comox (closed)
- Grouse Mountain, North Vancouver
- Harper Mountain, Kamloops
- Hart Highlands Ski Hill, Prince George
- Hudson Bay Mountain, Smithers
- Jumbo Glacier, Invermere (Development stalled)
- Kicking Horse Resort, Golden
- Kimberley Alpine Resort, Kimberley
- Little Mac Ski Hill, Mackenzie
- Manning Park (Gibson Pass), Hope-Princeton
- Mica Heliskiing Guides, Kinbasket Lake
- Mount Baldy Ski Area, Oliver (Baldy Mountain Resort)
- Mount Cain Ski Area, Vancouver Island
- Mount Seymour, North Vancouver
- Mount Timothy Ski Area, Lac La Hache/100 Mile
- Mount Washington Alpine Resort, Vancouver Island
- Murray Ridge Ski Area, Fort St. James
- Panorama Mountain Resort, Invermere
- Phoenix Mountain Ski Resort, Phoenix-Greenwood
- Powder King Mountain Resort, Mackenzie/Pine Pass
- Purden Ski Village, Prince George
- Red Mountain Resort, Rossland
- Revelstoke Mountain Resort, Revelstoke
- Salmo Ski Area, Salmo
- Sasquatch Mountain Resort, Chehalis/Harrison Mills
- Shames Mountain, Terrace
- Silver Star Mountain Resort, Vernon
- Silvertip Ski Area, Sunshine Valley, Hope-Princeton (closed)
- Summit Lake Ski Area, Nakusp
- Sun Peaks Resort, Sun Peaks
- Tabor Mountain Alpine Resort, Prince George
- Troll Ski Resort, Quesnel-Wells
- Whistler Blackcomb, Whistler
- Whitewater Ski Resort, Nelson

== Manitoba ==
- Asessippi Ski Area
- Falcon Ridge Ski Area
- Holiday Mountain Ski Resort
- Mount Agassiz Ski Resort (closed)
- Mystery Mountain Winter Park
- Ski Valley (Minnedosa)
- Springhill Winter Sports Park
- Stony Mountain Ski Area
- Thunderhill Ski Area

== New Brunswick ==
- Crabbe Mountain
- Mount Farlagne
- Poley Mountain
- Sugarloaf

== Newfoundland and Labrador ==
- Birch Brook Nordic Ski Club
- Marble Mountain
- Menihek Nordic Ski Club
- Smokey Mountain Ski Club
- Snow Goose Mountain Park and Resort
- White Hills

== Northwest Territories ==
- Bristol Pit, Yellowknife

== Nova Scotia ==
- Ski Ben Eoin
- Ski Cape Smokey
- Ski Martock
- Ski Wentworth

== Ontario ==
- Adanac Ski Hill
- Alpine Ski Club of Toronto
- Antoine Mountain
- Batawa Ski Hill
- Beaver Valley Ski Club
- Blue Mountain
- Boler Mountain
- Brimacombe
- Calabogie Peaks
- Caledon Ski Club
- Centennial Park (Closed)
- Chicopee
- Cobble Hills Ski Club
- Craigleith Ski Club
- Dagmar
- Devil's Elbow Ski Area (Closed (Note: May be replaced by 'Bethany Ski Resort' in the future))
- Devil's Glen Country Club
- Dryden Ski Club
- Dummy's hill
- Georgian Peaks Club
- Glen Eden
- Gravenhurst Nordic Trails
- Hardwood Hills
- The Heights of Horseshoe Ski and Country Club
- Hidden Valley Highlands
- Highlands Nordic
- Hockley Valley
- Horseshoe Valley Resort
- Kamiskotia Snow Resort
- Kawartha Nordic Ski Club
- Lakeridge Ski Resort
- Laurentian Ski Hill
- Loch Lomond Ski Area
- Mansfield Outdoor Center
- Mansfield Ski Club
- Mount Baldy (Ontario) Ski Area
- Mount Evergreen Ski Club
- Mount Chinguacousy
- Mount Dufour
- Mount Martin Ski Club
- Mount Pakenham
- Mount St. Louis Moonstone
- Mountain View Ski Area
- North York Ski Center
- Old Smokey (closed)
- Onaping Ski Hill
- Oshawa Ski Club (renamed Brimacombe)
- Osler Bluff Ski Club
- Pine Ridge Ski Club
- Searchmont Resort
- Sir Sam's Ski Area
- Ski Snow Valley
- Skyloft Ski Country Club (closed)
- Superior Slopes
- Talisman Resort (closed)
- Trestle Ridge Ski Slopes
- Uplands Ski Area

== Prince Edward Island ==
- Brookvale Winter Activity Park

== Quebec ==
- Ski Belle Neige
- Mont Bellevue
- Camp Fortune
- Tobo-Ski
- Sommet Edelweiss
- Gray Rocks
- Groupe Plein Air Terrebonne
- Le Massif
- Massif du Sud
- Mont Adstock
- Mont Alta
- Mont Avalanche
- Mont Cascades
- Mont-Castor
- Centre plein air du Mont Chalco
- Mont Chilly
- Mont Édouard
- Centre de ski Mont-Fortin
- Sommet Gabriel
- Ski Garceau
- Mont Gleason
- Mont Grand Fonds
- Mont Habitant
- Mont Kanasuta
- Ski La Réserve
- Mont Lac-Vert
- Sommet Olympia
- Mont Orignal
- Mont Saint-Mathieu
- Sommet Saint-Sauveur
- Mont Sainte-Anne
- Mont Shefford
- Mont Ste. Marie
- Mont Sutton
- Mont Tremblant Resort
- Mont-Vidéo
- Mont Villa Saguenay
- Montjoye
- Owl's Head
- Parc du Mont-Comi
- Pin Rouge
- Le Relais
- Ski Bromont
- Ski Chantecler
- Ski Chic-Chocs
- Ski Mont Blanc
- Ski Mont Orford
- Ski Mont Rigaud
- Ski Mont Saint-Bruno
- Ski Montcalm
- Sommet Morin Heights
- Ski Sutton
- Station de neige St-Pacome
- Station de Ski Gallix
- Stoneham
- Ski La Tuque
- Val-d'Irene
- Val Mauricie
- Val Neigette
- Val Saint-Côme (46.272526°N 73.869452°W) in Saint-Côme
- Le Valinouët
- Vallee Bleue
- Vallee du Parc
- Ski Mont Sauvage
- Vorlage

== Saskatchewan ==
- Blackstrap Ski Hill, Blackstrap Provincial Park (ski hill closed but the park has cross-country skiing)
- Cypress Hills Ski Area, Cypress Hills Interprovincial Park (cross-country skiing)
- Duck Mountain Ski Area, Duck Mountain Provincial Park
- Mission Ridge Winter Park, RM of North Qu'Appelle No. 187
- Kinsmen Ski and Snowboard Centre, Prince Albert
- Optimist Hill, Saskatoon
- Ski Timber Ridge, RM of Big River No. 555
- Table Mountain Ski Resort, RM of Battle River No. 438
- Wapiti Valley Regional Park, RM of Nipawin No. 487
- White Butte Trails Recreation Site, White Butte (cross-country skiing)

== Yukon ==
- Moose Mountain
- Mt. Maichen
- Mt Sima
