= Ski Snow Valley =

Ski Snow Valley Resort

- Location within Southern Ontario Location within Ontario
- Nearest city: Barrie, Ontario
- Coordinates: 44.4114°N 79.7926°W
- Vertical: 85 m (279 ft)
- Top elevation: 321 m (1,053 ft)
- Base elevation: 236 m (774 ft)
- Skiable area: ≈ 85 acres (34 ha)
- Trails: 20 ski slopes; 9 – Easiest; 5 – More Difficult; 5 – Most Difficult; 1 – Expert; 14 snowtubing chutes
- Longest run: 0.625 mi (1.006 km)
- Lift system: 9
- Terrain parks: 1
- Snowfall: 238 centimetres (94 in)
- Snowmaking: Yes
- Night skiing: Yes
- Website: www.skisnowvalley.com

Ski Snow Valley is a ski resort located in Minesing, Ontario, north of Barrie Ontario. It has 3 ski lifts and a snow tubing facility operating in the winter. In the summers, Snow Valley offers weddings, banquet and corporate events. Ski Snow Valley was named "best Ontario hill for kids" by Ski Canada Magazine in 2001.

== Operations ==
Snow Valley has 3 chair lifts currently operating. A quad chair services the eastern side of the resort. Central to the chalet, a 6-person fixed-grip chairlift with a rolling carpet for easy use operates. Further west, a smaller 3-person chairlift services a terrain park and 3 other pistes.

The ski resort runs snow machines principally in the start of the season, and grooms all runs daily. All runs (except for one) are lit with lights for night skiing.

The resort is generally focused on beginner-level terrain and family recreation. The resort has a learning area called the "Adventure Learning Centre" which is serviced by three magic carpet lifts. The largest trail, "Family Hill" is a green circle that connects the 4-person and 6-person lifts. The resort has five black-diamond runs, and one short double black-diamond run.

A snow-tubing park with automated lifts was built immediately west of the ski area in 2002. It features 14 different chutes, with varied elevations.

Snow Valley hosts ski races several times a year through Alpine Ontario.

Apart from skiing & snowboarding, there is snow tubing, a child care program, and ski/snowboard lessons.

The resort also accepts the Grade 4 & 5 SnowPass.

== History ==
The resort was created by 10 members called the "Triple S Club" (Ski, Safety and Sociability), in 1952.

In 1987 the resort began a fundraiser called M*A*S*H Bash which runs each year for the local RVH Hospital The popular day includes events with themes from the television show, including bedpan races.

Snow Valley has had two serious chairlift incidents in its history. One occurred in 1995, but no one was hurt. In 1996 a 19-year-old ski instructor was killed at Snow Valley Resort when his lift derailed. The resort was initially charged with nine counts of failing to comply with safety standards, but the charges were dismissed in 2003 after review.

In 2009 a 13 year old boy died after a collision with a tree on a beginner trail. He was skiing on a school trip.

In 2012, for its 50th anniversary, Snow Valley offered very discounted season passes to anyone with their 50th birthday that year.

== Related Ski Areas ==
- Blue Mountain Ski Resort
- Horseshoe Resort
- Mount St. Louis Moonstone Ski Resort
- Beaver Valley Ski Club

== See also ==
- List of ski areas and resorts in Canada
