= Craigleith Ski Club =

Ski resort in Ontario, Canada

- Location within Southern Ontario
- Location: The Blue Mountains, Ontario, Canada
- Nearest city: Collingwood
- Coordinates: 44°31′00″N 80°20′00″W
- Vertical: 211 m (692 ft)
- Top elevation: 446 m (1,463 ft)
- Base elevation: 235 m (771 ft)
- Trails: 33
- Lift system: 6 (3 high speed quads, 2 Fixed grip chairlifts, 1 Magic Carpet)
- Terrain parks: 1
- Night skiing: special events only
- Website: Craigleith.com

Craigleith Ski Club is a private alpine ski resort in Ontario, Canada, near Collingwood. It features 5 ski lifts, 1 Surface lift, 33 trails and a terrain park. The club was founded in 1958. There are 4 base lodges and a rental shop at the bottom of the hill. The lodges offer services such as lockers, restrooms, food services and first aid. Craigleith Ski Club has alpine ski racing programs for athletes in the U8 to U21 age categories. The club hosts Alpine Ontario and FIS-sanctioned races. Craigleith also has park teams that compete against other private clubs in the area. In February 2017 Craigleith hosted the Canadian Snowshoe Championships on its famous 'Switchback' trails.

Annually the club hosts the 'Podborski Cup SG race' the Nik Zoricic Cup, as well as Alpine Ontario and FIS sanctioned races. The club is open Wednesday through Sunday during the ski season. Corporate and Private functions (ski days, weddings, etc.) can be booked through the club office.

== See also ==
- Alpine Ski Club of Toronto
- Beaver Valley
- Blue Mountain
- Georgian Peaks
