= Mount St. Louis Moonstone =

Ski resort in southern Ontario, Canada

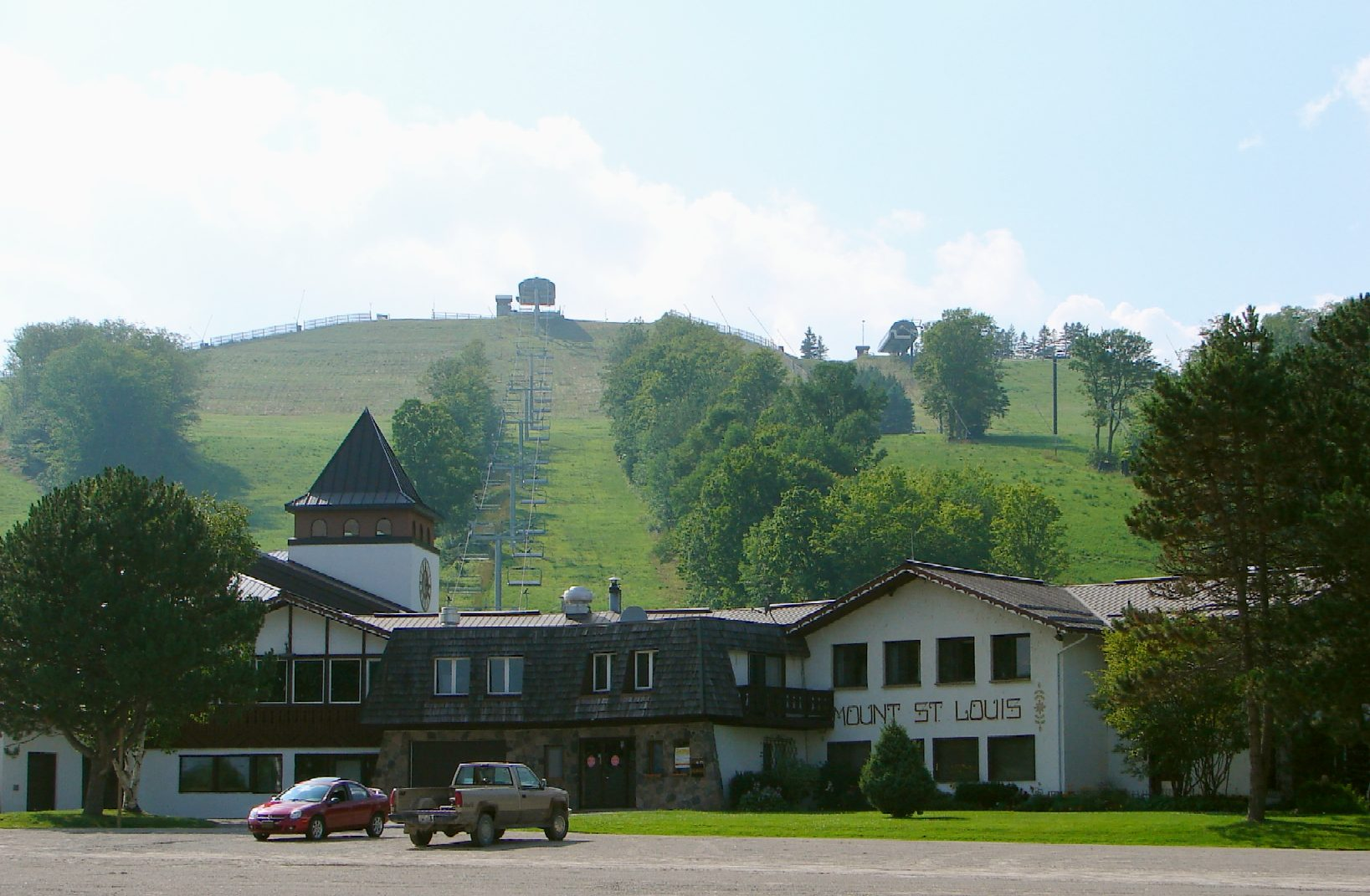

- Location within Southern Ontario Location within Ontario
- Location: Moonstone, Ontario, Canada
- Nearest city: Barrie
- Coordinates: 44°37′36″N 79°40′07″W
- Vertical: 168 m (551 ft)
- Top elevation: 382 m (1,253 ft)
- Base elevation: 229 m (751 ft)
- Skiable area: 75 ha (190 acres)
- Trails: 40; 35% – Easiest; 50% – More Difficult; 15% – Most Difficult
- Longest run: 1,609 m (5,279 ft)
- Lift system: 11 1 high-speed eight-pack chairlift 3 high-speed six-pack chairlifts 2 quad chairlifts 2 triple chairlifts 3 surface lifts
- Lift capacity: 23,600 per hour (2018)
- Terrain parks: Yes, 3
- Snowfall: 305 centimetres (120 in)
- Snowmaking: Yes, 100%
- Night skiing: Yes
- Website: Mount St. Louis Moonstone

Mount St. Louis Moonstone is a southern Ontario ski resort located north of Barrie. The resort is just over one hour driving time from Toronto and is located just off Highway 400. Although the hill itself is fairly small, it has been extensively built out, with three high-speed six-pack and one eight-pack lifts against a total of nine Chairlifts and three Surface lifts.

== History ==
In 1956, Josl Huter, a skier who had formerly competed in the Austrian National Alpine Championships, emigrated to Toronto from Austria to start a career in the automotive industry. He returned to the ski industry again the next year almost by accident, after meeting a friend who worked at the Limberlost Resort outside of Huntsville, Ontario who asked Huter to fill in for a sick instructor. Huter was diagnosed with a small brain tumour which was removed in January 1958, but returned to the industry the following year. During the summer he returned to Austria and married, working in a small inn there during the summer, and as a ski instructor in Canada in the winter, now at Muskoka Sands Resort.

In the spring of 1963, he was offered a manager position at Horseshoe Valley Ski Resort just north of Barrie, but when this position did not pan out a friend mentioned that there was another potential resort location nearby. They sold their Austrian inn and purchased the land in the fall of 1963, starting work cutting the trails that December. Bulldozers were used to clear out additional brush and rocks in May 1964, and two 1,600-foot-long T-bars (490 m) were added late that fall.

Mount St. Louis first opened for business on December 16, 1964. The weather did not cooperate, and all the snow melted off four days later, so local high-school students were hired to carry snow from the surrounding bush and dump it on the trail in an effort to keep it open. This sort of thaw proved to be common, not entirely surprising given the south-east facing slopes. To address this problem, the first snowmaking system was installed in 1966. The hill rapidly expanded over the next few years. Additional runs were added in 1967 and 68, along with a new triple chair in 1969, being the first of this kind to be brought into Canada. New trails were added in 1971 and a new double chair was added to serve them the next year.

Through the 1970s, a number of new resorts in the Collingwood area offered higher verticals, drawing business away from Mount St.Louis. In 1978 Huter responded by moving 400,000 m^{3} (520,000 cu yd) of dirt onto the top of the original triple-served run, raising it about 550 feet (170 m). By the time construction was completed in 1979, 600,000 m^{3} (780,000 cu yd) had been moved, giving the hill its current 168 m (551 ft) vertical.

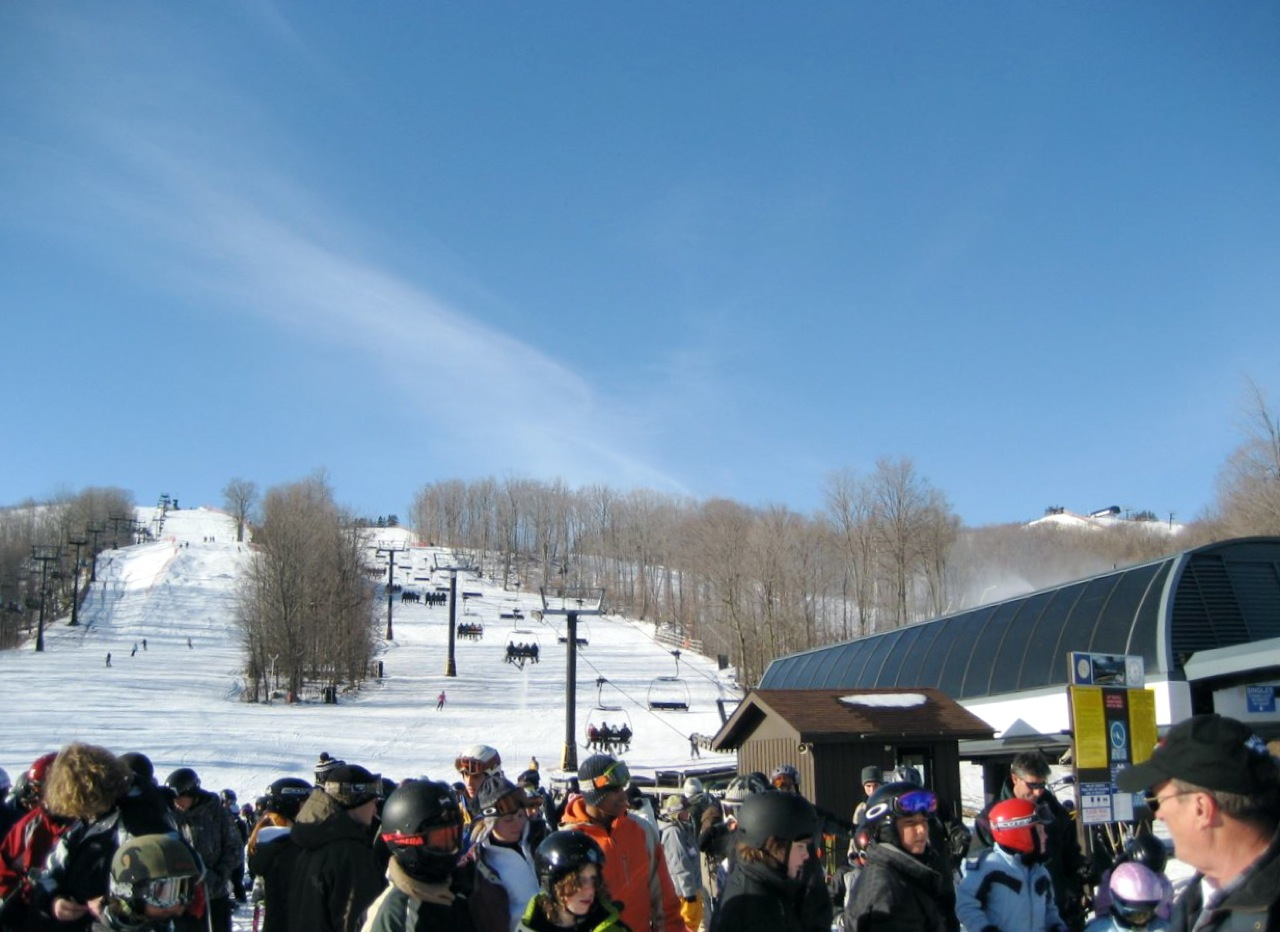
A quad-passenger chairlift at Mount St. Louis Moonstone.

Throughout this period a second hill was developing only a few hundred metres to the north, Moonstone. In 1983 they had installed Canada's first quad chair on their longest trail. In 1984 Huter purchased Moonstone, and started moving 500,000 m^{3} (650,000 cu yd) of dirt onto the top of its quad-served run, raising it in the same fashion as Mt. St. Louis had been earlier, but only to 420 feet (130 m).

The next year the original T-bars on Mt. St. Louis were replaced by a new quad, giving the combined Mt. St. Louis Moonstone the largest uphill capacity in Ontario (at the time). Moonstone was again raised, this time to 500 ft. In 1989 the Mt. St. Louis peak was again expanded with another 700,000 m^{3} (920,000 cu yd) of dirt, and a high-speed quad was added to service it, replacing the earlier triple. The next major expansion was in 1996, when another 650,000 m^{3} (850,000 cu yd) was added to Moonstone, and one of Moonstone's quads was replaced with a high-speed six-pack. In 2007 another high speed six-pack was added to Mt. St Louis, replacing one triple and one double chair.

In the summer of 2013, the first set of lights were added to some trails for night skiing starting the next season.

In the summer of 2023, Adventure 8 was added to Mt. Moonstone, replacing Adventure Express. The lift was installed under partnership with Doppelmayr Canada, becoming the nation's first eight-seated chairlift.

== Mountain statistics ==
The base elevation is 215 m (705 ft) above sea level and the vertical drop is 153 m (502 ft).

- Mount St Louis - 368 m (1,207 ft)
- Moonstone - 360 m (1,181 ft)

=== Trails ===
- 36 trails (Mount St Louis & Moonstone) measuring 20 km (12 miles)
  - 35% – Easiest
  - 50% – More Difficult
  - 15% – Most Difficult

=== Lift Roster ===
- Mount St Louis has 11 Lifts, including Adventure 8 & Elfriede Express that have seat heating. (4 surface lifts).

Lift Name	Type	Builder	Built	Length (meters)	Vertical Rise (meters)	Notes
Adventure 8	High Speed Eight	Dopplemayr	2023	652	145	Moonstone Side Heated seats, Locking safety bar, conveyor belt. First 8-seater chair in Canada
Elfriede Express	High Speed Six	Dopplemayr	2025	668	111	Moonstone Side Heated seats, Locking safety bar, Conveyor belt, & Mantis System. Directly Serves Outback Terrain park & SBX Course.
Summit Express	High Speed Six	Leitner-Poma	2007	629	140	Mount St Louis Side
Josl Huter Express	High Speed Six	Leitner-Poma	2019	659	128	Mount St Louis Side Parallel to Summit Express, directly serves Junkyard terrain park.
Promenade Express	High Speed Six	Poma	1999	714	123	Moonstone Side
Sundance	Fixed-grip quad	Leitner-Poma	2010	532	138	Mount St Louis Side Loading Carpet
Gentle Ben	Fixed-grip triple	BM Lifts	1992	381	50	Mount St Louis Side Beginner lift & directly serves the skoolyard terrain park.
Magic Carpet	Magic Carpet	Sun Kid	1998	57		Mount St Louis Side
Kinder A&B Carpet	Magic Carpet	Sun Kid	2003/2005	90		Mount St Louis Side
Novice Carpet	Magic Carpet		2023	95		Moonstone Side

== See also ==
- Blue Mountain
- Horseshoe Resort
- Beaver Valley
- List of ski areas and resorts in Canada
