= Snow Valley =

Snow Valley may refer to:

- Snow Valley Ski Club, a ski resort in Edmonton, Alberta, Canada
- Ski Snow Valley, a ski resort in Barrie, Ontario, Canada
- Snow Valley Mountain Resort, a ski resort in Running Springs, California, United States
- Snow Valley, a 2024 psychological thriller film
