= Mount Tabor (British Columbia) =

Mountain in British Columbia, Canada

- Tabor Mountain
- Location within British Columbia
- Interactive map of Mount Tabor

Highest point
- Elevation: 1,247 m (4,091 ft)
- Prominence: 417 m (1,368 ft)
- Listing: Mountains of British Columbia
- Coordinates: 53°54′48″N 122°27′07″W

Geography
- Country: Canada
- Province: British Columbia
- District: Cariboo Land District
- Parent range: Columbia Mountains
- Topo map: NTS 93G16 Wansa Creek

Mount Tabor, 1,247 m (4,091 ft), is a mountain 20 km (12 mi) east of Prince George, British Columbia, Canada adjacent to BC Highway 16. It rises about 550 m (1,804 ft) from the small portion of the Nechako Plateau that lies in the angle of the Fraser River and not part of the Cariboo Mountains which begin just to the east, the summit is the site of a former fire lookout tower and is the highest piece of relief in the Greater Prince George area (it may also in some reckonings be the northward limit of the Quesnel Highland rather than part of the plateau).

The highest summit of a generally north-striking ridge between Prince George and the lowland of the Willow River, its summit has about 550m of relief from the surrounding terrain; Tabor Lake at its foot to the west is 705 m (2,313 ft) in elevation. As such, it has become the site of the small Tabor Mountain Ski Resort, which is one of Prince George's two local ski hills, the other being the small Hart Highlands Alpine Park on the north side of the city. East of the Willow River and just beyond the Bowron River, forty kilometres farther east, is Mount Purden, the site of Purden Ski Village and which is the northernmost summit of the Cariboo Mountains.
