= Hidden Valley Highlands =

Canadian resort

Hidden Valley Highlands Ski Area
- Location: Huntsville, Ontario, Canada
- Vertical: 100 m (330 ft)
- Top elevation: 389 m (1,276 ft)
- Base elevation: 289 m (948 ft)
- Skiable area: 14 ha (35 acres)
- Trails: 15
- Longest run: 0.58 km (0.36 mi)
- Lift system: 4 (3 Fixed Grip chairlifts, 1 Handle Tow)
- Lift capacity: 6,500 per hour
- Terrain parks: 1
- Snowfall: 343 cm (135 in)
- Snowmaking: 90%
- Night skiing: Yes

Hidden Valley Highlands Ski Area is Muskoka's ski hill located in the heart of cottage country, Huntsville, Ontario, Canada. Hidden Valley Highlands Ski Area features 15 groomed trails, three quad chairlifts, one handle tow, two snow cats, night skiing and snowboarding, and a terrain park. Since 1961, HVHSA (Hidden Valley Highlands Ski Area) has been providing winter family fun and is Muskoka's largest outdoor winter recreational facility. The Muskoka Ski Club was established in 1971 as the Hidden Valley Highlands Ski Club. The name was changed in 2008. As of 2023, the Muskoka Ski Club has members from over 278 family units.

== Facts ==
- Average snowfall: 317 cm (125 inches)
- Season: Late November–Mid March
- Lifts: 3 Quad Chairs, 1 Handle Tow
- Snowmaking: 80%
- Uphill capacity: 6500 persons per hour
- Longest run: 580 meters (1902 feet)
- Vertical: 100 meters (333 feet)
- Night skiing: Yes
- Terrain Park: Yes
- Ski-able acres: 35 acres (14 hectares)
- Summit elevation: 389 meters (1276 feet)
- Base elevation: 289 meters (949 feet)
- Cafeteria: Yes

== Surrounding resorts and hotels ==
- Hidden Valley Resort
- Delta Grandview Resort
- Holiday Inn (under construction)
- King William Inn
- Deerhurst

== See also ==
- List of ski areas and resorts in Canada
