= Sommet Edelweiss =

Ski resort in Quebec, Canada

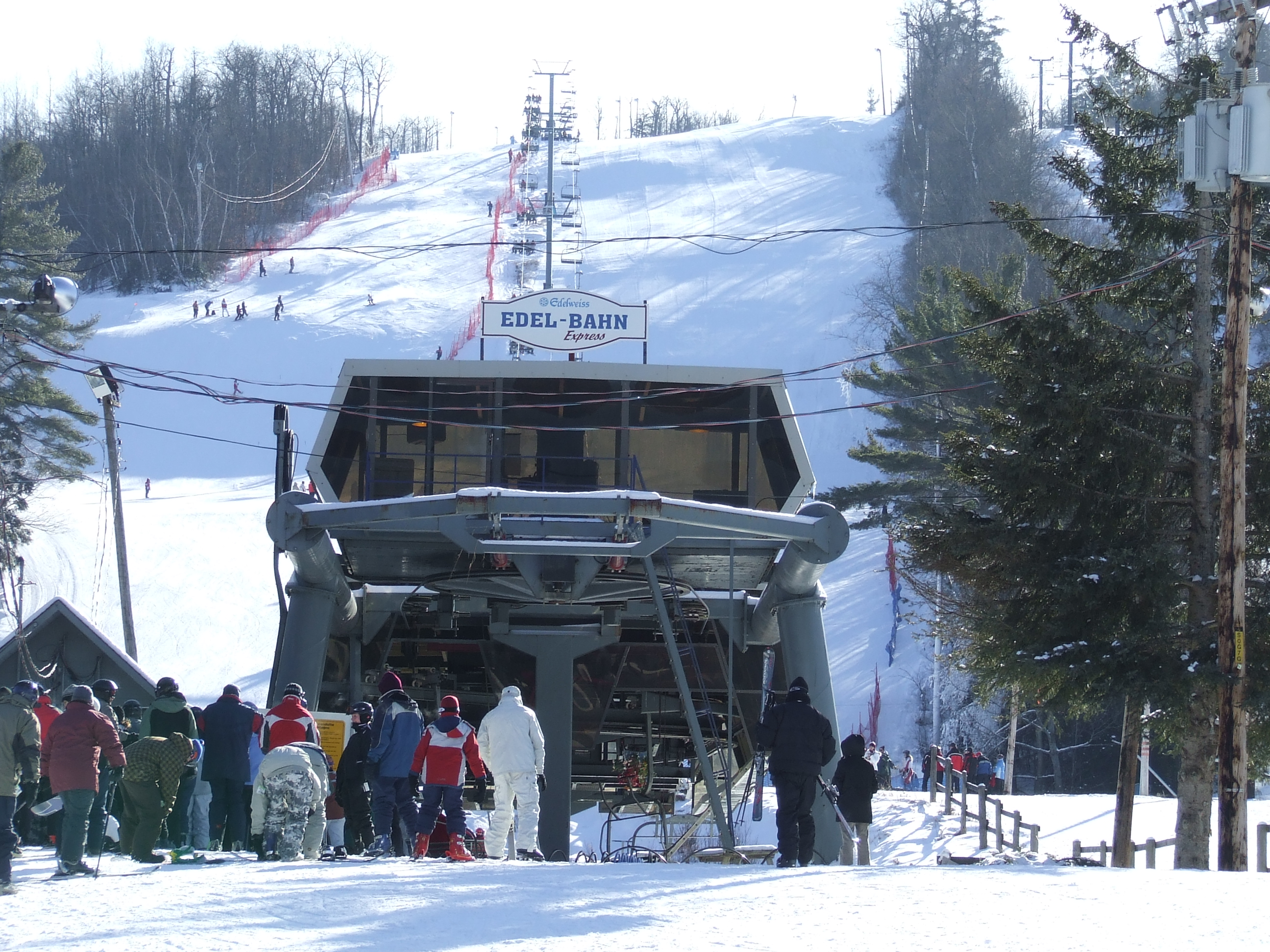
- Interactive map of Sommet Edelweiss
- Location: Wakefield, La Pêche, Quebec, Canada
- Nearest city: Gatineau, Quebec 28 km
- Coordinates: 45°38′45″N 75°51′05″W
- Vertical: 200 m (660 ft)
- Top elevation: 350 m (1,150 ft)
- Base elevation: 150 m (490 ft)
- Skiable area: 160 acres (65 ha)
- Trails: 20 total 45% Easy; 25% Intermediate; 30% Difficult
- Longest run: 1.5 km (0.93 mi)
- Lift system: 4 total 1 detachable quad 2 quadruple chairs 3 magic carpets
- Lift capacity: 7,500 skiers/hr
- Snowmaking: 90%
- Night skiing: 13 out of 20 trails
- Website: https://www.sommets.com/en/ski-mountains/sommet-edelweiss

Sommet Edelweiss is a ski area located in Wakefield, Quebec, 30 minutes north of Ottawa, Ontario, Canada, in the Gatineau Hills.

== Description ==
Sommet Edelweiss is a ski resort located in Wakefield, Quebec, approximately 30 minutes north of Ottawa. It is family oriented and consists of mostly beginner and intermediate terrain. There is a snow tubing park that is popular for families and school field trips. Edelweiss Valley was acquired by Les Sommets inc. in 2000. The ski area was started by three partners, Andy Tommy, who ran the ski area, and Art Tommy and Reg Lefebvre who ran the ski shop Tommy and Lefebvre. The early years brought many improvements such as snowmaking and night skiing, they were open daily from 8:30 am to 10 PM.

Dick Gagne was the Mountain manager and worked there for almost 15 years until he retired.

Some famous ski racers came from Edelweiss, Mike Tommy, Michaela Tommy, Lizbeth Tommy, Mike Gagne, and many others

== Improvements since 2000 ==
Since Les Sommets inc. acquired Sommet Edelweiss, improvements have included:

- two additional quad chairlifts have been installed. A Doppelmayr quad chairlift (to replace an old Yan double chair), and a Poma quad chairlift (to replace the old Poma double chair).
- a new beginner trail was created (Chemin des Bois) as an addition to the existing Easy Street trail,
- a snow tubing park was opened, serviced by a triple chair (that has since been removed) and magic carpet,
- snowmaking efficiency and capacity were improved, and grooming.
- A Rockstar Energy Drink sponsored snowpark (MSS Rockstar SnoPrk)
- For the 2021 season, Sommet Edelweiss introduced their newly expanded lodge addition which featured more indoor seating and storage areas.
- A new covered magic carpet has been installed along with a new run to accommodate it.

== See also ==
- MSSI-Mont Saint-Sauveur International
- List of ski areas and resorts in Canada
