= Tabor Mountain Ski Resort =

Ski resort in British Columbia, Canada

Coordinates: 53°56′40″N 122°27′14″W

Tabor Mountain Ski Resort, also known as Tabor Mountain Alpine Resort, is a ski resort located 20 km (12 mi) east of Prince George, British Columbia, Canada, adjacent to BC Hwy 16 on Mount Tabor.

The resort has one triple chair, with a handle tow in the lessons area.

- Vertical drop: 255 m (837 ft)
- Base elevation: 785 m (2,575 ft)
- Top elevation: 1,040 m (3,410 ft)
- Skiable acreage: 73 hectares (180 acres)
- Number of winter runs: 21
- Difficulty: Novice – 25%, Intermediate – 50%, Advanced – 25%
- Number of lifts: 1 triple chair, 1 handle tow for lessons
- Lift capacity: 1,450 skiers per hour

== See also ==
- Purden Ski Village
- Hart Highlands Ski Hill
