= Groupe Plein Air Terrebonne =

Coordinates: 45°42′37″N 73°39′48″W

- Interactive map of Groupe Plein Air Terrebonne
- Location: 1150, rue Côte Boisée; Terrebonne, Quebec; J6X 4R8
- Vertical: 30 m (98 ft)
- Top elevation: 30 m (98 ft)
- Base elevation: 0 m (0 ft)
- Trails: 2 Total: 100% - easy; 0% - difficult; 0% - more difficult
- Longest run: 250 m (820 ft)
- Lift system: 3 total 2 surface lifts, 1 magic carpet
- Snowfall: 395 cm (156 in) per year
- Night skiing: Yes
- Website: gpat.ca

The Groupe Plein Air Terrebonne (GPAT) is a not for profit ski resort based in Terrebonne, Quebec. It is accredited by the Quebec Association of Ski Resorts (Association des stations de ski du Québec) and has received numerous awards recognizing the quality of its facilities and snow school. Apart from being a ski resort, the organization also holds summer and winter day camps and organizes mountain biking competitions. A secondary site near the Rivière des Mille Îles allows rental of aquatic equipment for activities such as kayaking, canoeing, Rabaska, and stand up paddleboarding. Part of their mission is to promote health and physical activity within the community by organizing activities on its various sites in Terrebonne, Quebec.

== Côte Boisée ==
The GPAT's primary site is known as the Côte Boisée. This is where the ski resort and snow school are located. Mountain biking facilities are also present on this site for training and competitions during the summer months.

== TransTerrebonne ==
The TransTerrebonne is a series of paths used for bicycle rides, walking, and jogging during the warmer months. During the winter, the paths are used for walking, snowshoeing, and cross-country skiing. The GPAT ensures the maintenance of these two dozen kilometers of paths through the woods with one of its specially built groomers.

Some winter enthusiasts also use fat bikes in some of these trails.

== Mountain biking ==
In 2016, the GPAT, in collaboration with the city of Terrebonne, hosted the mountain biking competitions as part of the Jeux du Québec (Quebec provincial games).

== Parc de la Rivière ==
The GPAT has a secondary site near the Rivière des Mille Îles where nautical activities are practiced during the summer months. There is also the opportunity to explore aquatic fauna and flora through various observation paths. Part of the site is dedicated to the practice of disc golf and bow and arrow.

== Awards ==
In 2016, the GPAT was awarded the trophy from the Gala Vision in the category Nonprofit organization.
