= Harper Mountain =

Ski resort in British Columbia, Canada

- Interactive map of Harper Mountain
- Location: British Columbia, Canada
- Nearest city: Kamloops, 15 km
- Coordinates: 50°43′16″N 120°7′56″W
- Vertical: 427 m (1,401 ft)
- Top elevation: 1,524 m (5,000 ft)
- Base elevation: 1,100 m (3,600 ft)
- Skiable area: 1.22 km^{2} (0.47 sq mi)
- Trails: 15
- Longest run: 366 m (1,201 ft)
- Lift system: 3 total (1 handle tow, 1 T-bar, 1 triple chairlift)
- Snowfall: 4 m (13 ft)
- Website: Harper Mountain

Harper Mountain is the name of a ski area located outside of Kamloops, British Columbia, Canada (the name of the actual mountain it is located on is Mount Harper).

The mountain has a vertical drop of 427 m (1,400 ft), a base elevation of 1,100 m (3,600 ft) and a top elevation of 1,524 m (5,000 ft). It offers 400 acres (1.2 km^{2}) of skiable area on 15 different trails. In terms of lifts, it has one chair lift, one T-bar, and one rope tow. The mountain also has a terrain park, a snow tube park, cross country skiing, and a skating pond.

Although Harper Mountain does not offer the amenities of larger resorts such as hotels, restaurants, and specialty stores, it does have a log-construction ski lodge, an equipment rental shop, and offers ski and snowboard lessons.

== Trails ==
| Green | Blue | Black | Double Black |
|---|---|---|---|
| Bunny Hill | Big Bend | Maxi Pipe | Cliffhanger |
| | Trail To Lodge | Monashee | Pioneer |
| | Midway | Lift Line | Blowdown |
| | Little Bend | Bush Wacker |
| | Chair Run | Funpipe |
| | Tunnel | Spillway |

== See also ==
- List of ski areas and resorts in Canada
