= Phoenix Mountain Ski Resort =

Phoenix Mountain
- Interactive map of Phoenix Mountain
- Location: Kootenay Boundary, British Columbia, Canada
- Nearest city: Grand Forks
- Coordinates: 49°06′32″N 118°35′10″W
- Vertical: 215 m (705 ft)
- Top elevation: 1,479 m (4,852 ft)
- Base elevation: 1,264 m (4,147 ft)
- Skiable area: 91 acres (0.4 km^{2})
- Trails: 16 Designated Trails; 4 – Beginner; 7 – Intermediate; 7 – Advanced
- Longest run: 1.3 km (0.81 mi)
- Lift system: 1 T-bar lift 1 Rope Tow
- Lift capacity: 550 skiers/hr
- Snowfall: 8.89 m/year (350 in.)
- Website: Ski Phoenix

Phoenix Mountain is a small ski resort in the Boundary Country in southern British Columbia, between the towns of Greenwood and Grand Forks. It is a community owned ski hill. There is a lodge with a cafeteria, a rental shop and a terrain park. Phoenix ski hill has one T-Bar and one Rope Tow. There are 16 designated runs with 18 marked trails, and a dedicated trail for terrain and big air.

== See also ==
- Grand Forks, British Columbia
- Greenwood, British Columbia
- Phoenix, British Columbia
- List of ski areas and resorts in Canada
