= Georgian Peaks Club =

Private alpine ski resort on the Niagara Escarpment outside Thornbury, Ontario

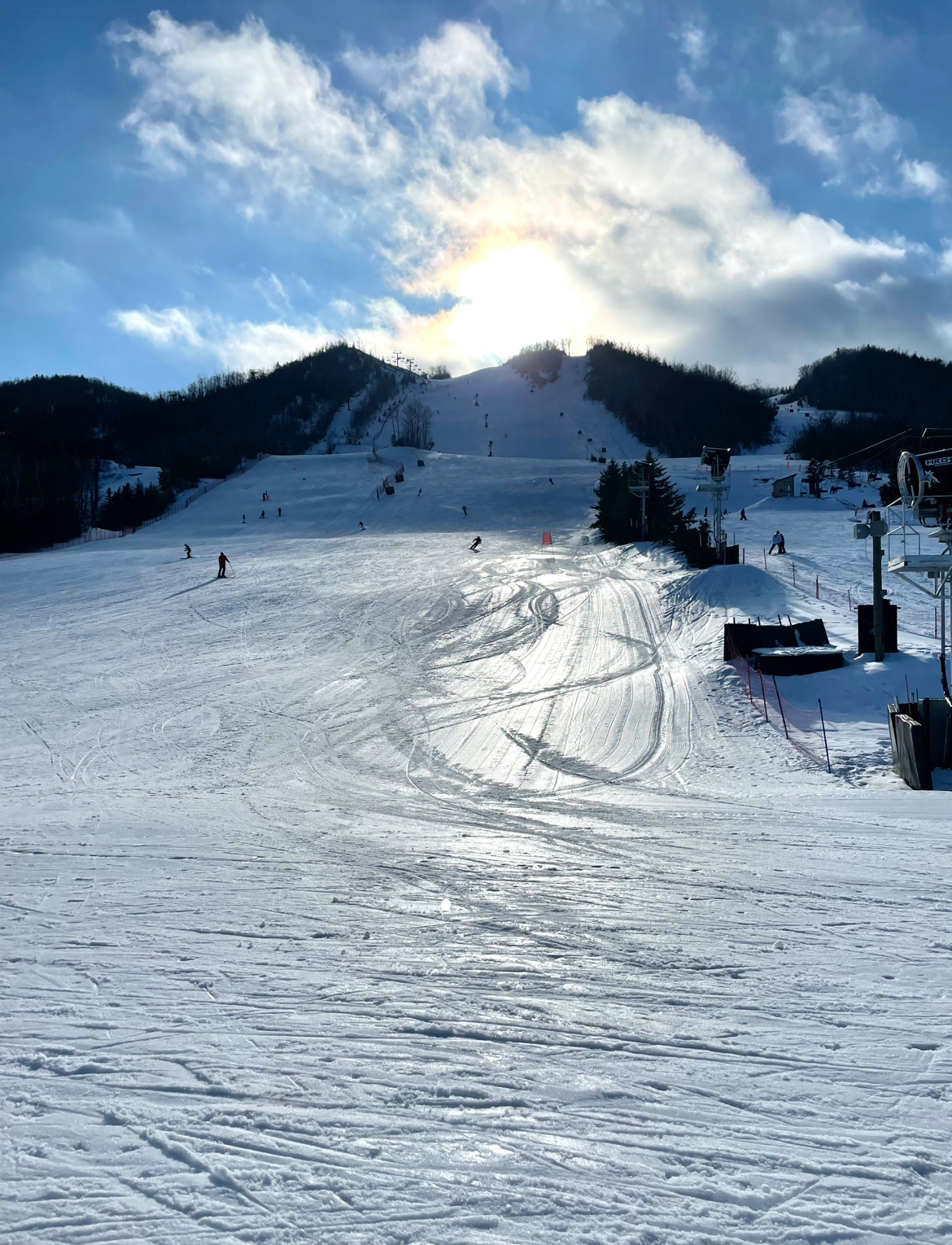

- Location within Southern Ontario
- Location: Thornbury, Ontario
- Nearest city: Barrie, Collingwood
- Coordinates: 44.5350°N 80.3767°W
- Vertical: 250 m (820 ft)
- Trails: 24
- Lift system: 3 quad chairs, 1 double chair, 1 surface lift
- Terrain parks: 2
- Website: The Georgian Peaks Club

Georgian Peaks is a private alpine ski resort located on the Niagara Escarpment just outside Thornbury, Ontario. It has the highest vertical drop of any resort in Ontario, at 820 feet (250 m), enough to allow it to host official FIS-standard slalom and giant slalom races. The hill focuses on more challenging terrain than nearby hills like Blue Mountain, featuring twenty-two named runs served by five chairlifts.

The club took a direct hit from an F2 tornado during the Central Ontario and GTA Tornado Outbreak, August 20, 2009. The damage was substantial, but the club was fully repaired and operational for opening day.

== See also ==
- Beaver Valley
- List of ski areas and resorts in Canada
- Bee Hive Ski Races, hosted by Georgian Peaks Club in 1961
