= Rabbit Hill Snow Resort =

Rabbit Hill
- Interactive map of Rabbit Hill
- Location: Edmonton River Valley
- Nearest city: Edmonton
- Coordinates: 53°22′48″N 113°40′16″W
- Vertical: 98 m (322 ft)
- Top elevation: 703 m
- Skiable area: 40 acres (16 ha)
- Trails: 11 60% - Easiest; 30% - More Difficult; 10% - Most Difficult
- Longest run: 800 m (2,620 ft)
- Lift system: 8 (1 Triple Chairlift, 3 Rope Tows, 2 T-bar, 3 Magic Carpet)
- Terrain parks: 3
- Snowfall: 122 cm (48 in)
- Snowmaking: 80%
- Night skiing: Yes
- Website: www.rabbithill.com

Rabbit Hill is a ski resort located on the south bank of the North Saskatchewan River in southwest Edmonton, Alberta, Canada. Rabbit Hill Snow Resort is the largest ski and snowboard facility in the Edmonton Area. Home to an award-winning Snow School, and one of the largest terrain parks in Northern Alberta, the terrain is suitable for newer skiers and will permit advanced skiers to develop their technique.

Rabbit Hill is home to Rabbit Hill Alpine Race Club, Parkland Racers, and Canadian Association for Disabled Skiing- Edmonton.
