= Ski Chantecler =

Coordinates: 45°57′40″N 74°10′22″W

- Interactive map of Ski Chantecler
- Location: Sainte-Adèle, Quebec
- Nearest city: Saint-Jérôme, Quebec
- Vertical: 183 m (600 ft)
- Top elevation: 457 m (1,499 ft)
- Base elevation: 274 m (899 ft)
- Trails: 17 Total; 18% Easy; 35% Intermediate; 47% Difficult
- Longest run: 17 km (11 mi)
- Lift system: 2 chairlifts
- Website: www.skichantecler.com

Ski Chantecler is a ski resort in the Laurentides region of the Canadian province of Quebec, Canada. It is a few minutes away from the town of Sainte-Adèle and one hour north from Montreal.

25 trails are available to ski.

The average annual snowfall is 381 cm and snowmaking is 85% over the entire skiable area.

Events scheduled here include the AT & T Classic, Tournée de glisse CIME FM, Tournée sécurité de l'ASSQ, Journée démo casque, etc.

== See also ==
- List of ski areas and resorts in Canada
