= Summit Lake Ski Area =

Small community-operated ski hill

Coordinates: 50°08′46″N 117°36′54″W

Summit Lake Ski Area is operated by the Nakusp Ski Club Association, a non-profit, volunteer-run society. Located at the lake and community of the same name, 16 km (9.9 mi) east of Nakusp, British Columbia, Canada, in that province's Arrow Lakes-Slocan region. The hill, located at the east end of the lake adjacent to BC Hwy 6 has a T-Bar and rope tow and a daylodge with cafeteria with rentals and lessons. The area features night skiing, snowboarding and a cross-country ski/ snowshoe trail.

Average annual snowfall is 3.8 m (12 ft), with a vertical drop of 152 m (499 ft) on 12 hectares (30 acres). There are eight runs, the longest of which is 152 m (499 ft).

== See also ==
- List of ski areas and resorts in Canada
