= Snow Valley Ski Club =

Ski resort in Edmonton, Alberta

Snow Valley
- Location within Edmonton Location within Alberta Location within Canada
- Location: Edmonton River Valley
- Nearest city: Edmonton
- Coordinates: 53°29′03″N 113°33′20″W
- Vertical: 40 m (130 ft)
- Top elevation: 665 m (2,182 ft)
- Base elevation: 625 m (2,051 ft)
- Skiable area: 20 acres (0.1 km^{2})
- Trails: 8; 40% - Easy; 50% - Intermediate; 10% - Difficult
- Longest run: 549 m (1,801.2 ft)
- Lift system: 4 (2 chairlift, 2 magic carpet)
- Lift capacity: 3,500 skiers/hr
- Terrain parks: 2
- Snowfall: 122 cm (48 in)
- Snowmaking: 95%
- Night skiing: Yes
- Website: Snow Valley

Snow Valley Ski Club is a ski area located in Edmonton, Alberta, near the Whitemud Freeway at 119 Street in Rainbow Valley. The resort functions as a not-for-profit organization. The slope caters primary to beginner skiers and snowboarders, with only 15% of the area designated as advanced.

It has one pulse quad chairlift, one triple chairlift, and two magic carpets. Snow Valley also has a variety of features and man-made jumps in their beginner and advanced terrain parks.

== History ==
Snow Valley was opened in 1961 by members of the Eskimo Ski Club. The original lodge was built in 1972 with two rope tows. In 1981 a T-bar replaced one of the rope tows, and limited snow making was added to extend the ski season. In 1988 a Triple chairlift was installed, along with expanded snow making capability. A significant amount of landfill was completed on the North Hill, where the present-day terrain park is located.

During the summer of 1995, Snow Valley management took over responsibilities of the adjacent Rainbow Valley Campground. The campground operates in the summer off season.

A new 17,800-square-foot (1,650 m^{2}) lodge was constructed in 2001, replacing the old lodge and maintenance buildings. Additionally in 2001 the first magic carpet was added. A second magic carpet replaced the handle tow in 2003.

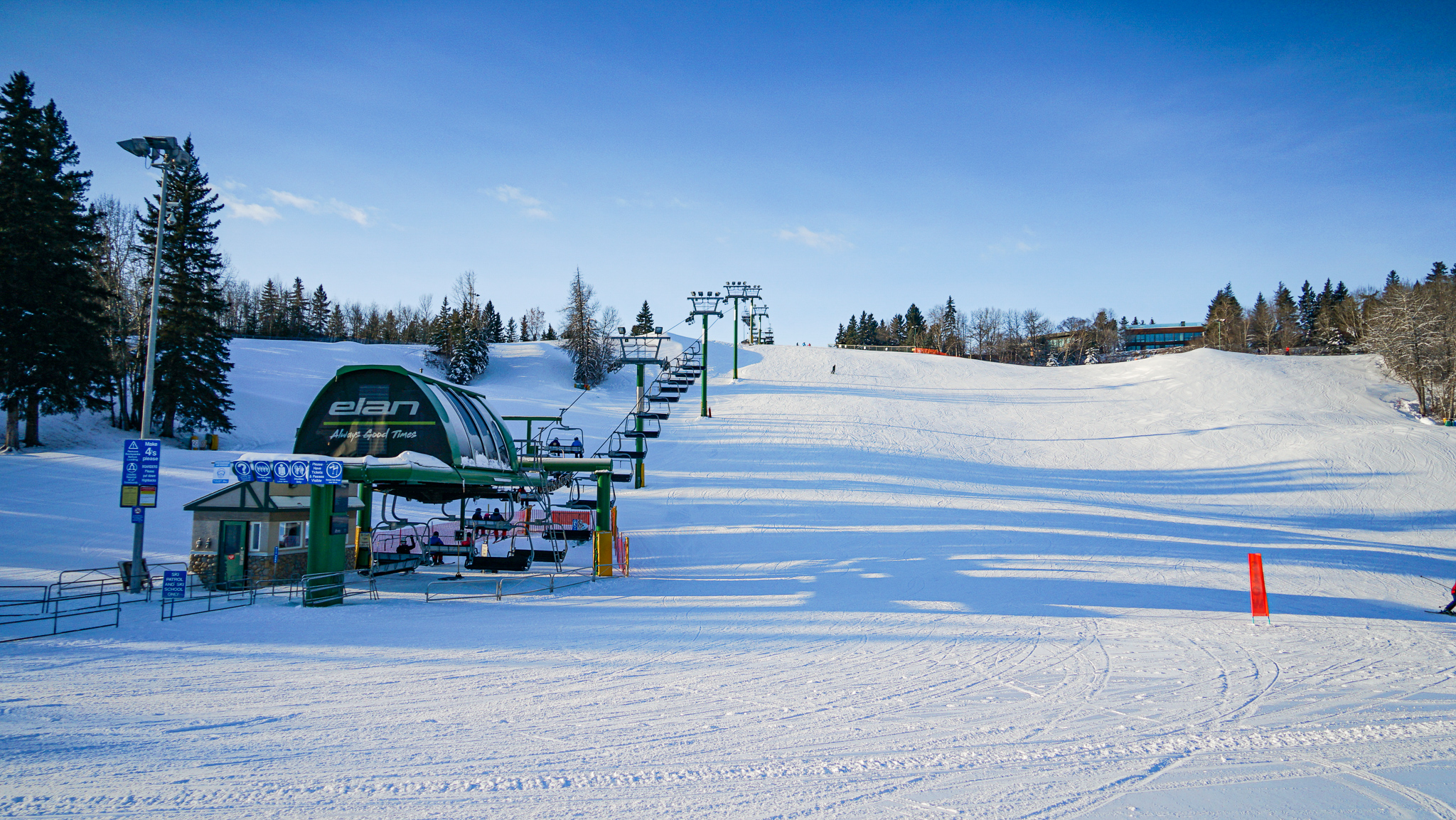
The entirety of Snow Valley Ski Club's terrain can be accessed by the high-speed pulse quad chairlift, installed in 2008.

In 2008, Snow Valley opened a first-of-its-kind high-speed 'pulse' quad chair. This chair replaced the t-bar and opened up more terrain.

== Summer Activities ==
During the off season, the Snow Valley Ski Club not-for-profit operates several seasonal summer attractions. Only attractions that have been present for over 3 years are included in the list below.

=== Snow Valley Aerial Park ===
The Snow Valley Aerial Park is a 15m (50ft) tall aerial-adventure tower built by German-based company Kristall Turm and operated by Snow Valley Ski Club. The tower was the first of its kind built in Canada though there are now several Kristall Turm towers in the country. The Snow Valley Aerial Park features approximately 100 Edmonton-themed features and was opened to the public in 2017.

=== Rainbow Valley Campground ===
The Rainbow Valley Campground is a long-running campground in Alberta, opened sometime before the 1970's, as the Whitemud Creek Mine operation (which closed in 1970) was described as immediately adjacent to the campground. The Rainbow Valley Campground today has over 75 sites and is open from May until October.

== See also ==
- List of ski areas and resorts in Canada
