= The Blue Mountains, Ontario =

The Blue Mountains
- Town (lower-tier)
- Town of The Blue Mountains
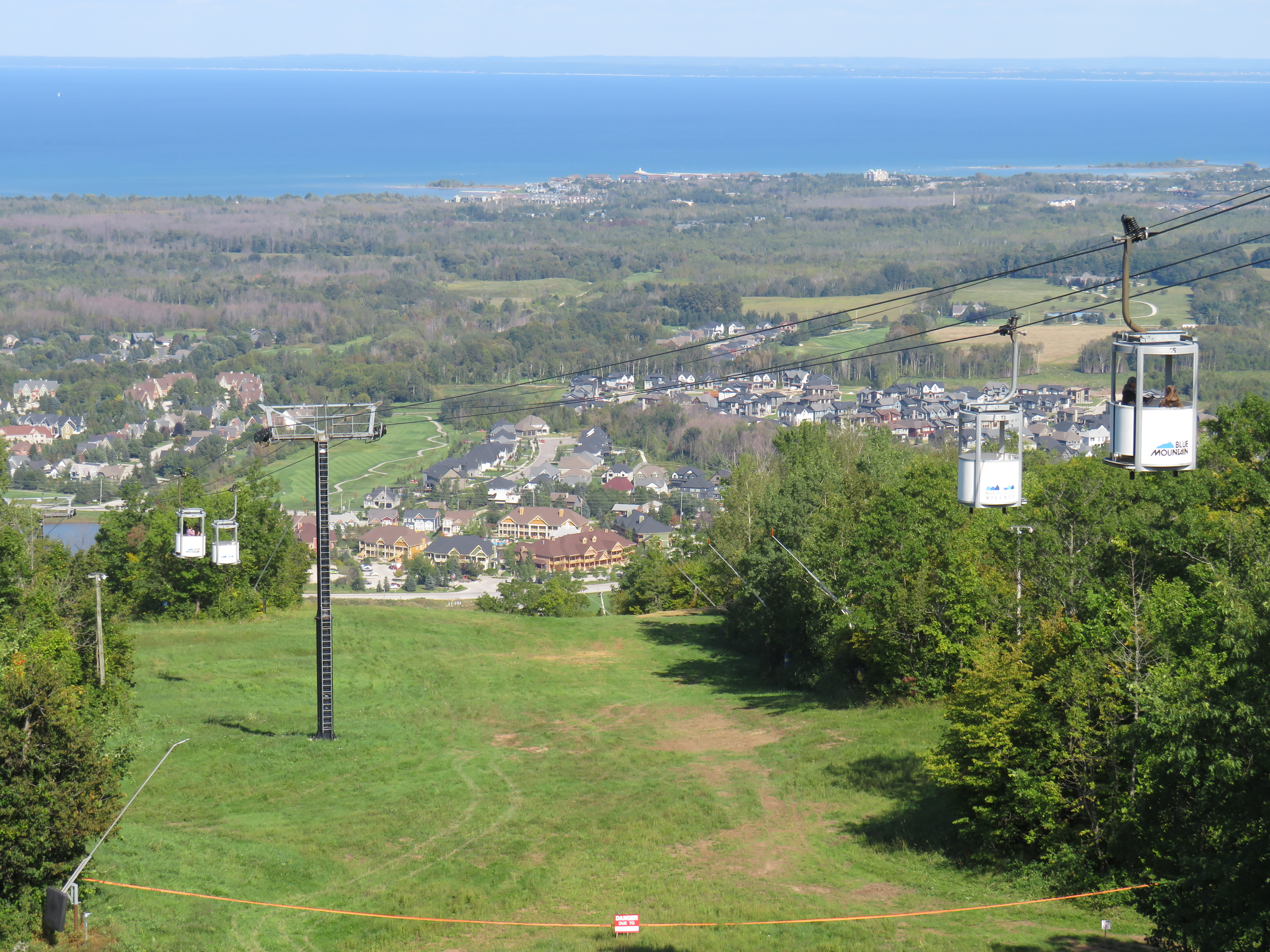
- Town of The Blue Mountains viewed from the top of Blue Mountain

- Location within Grey County Location within Southern Ontario
- Coordinates: 44°29′N 80°23′W
- Country: Canada
- Province: Ontario
- County: Grey
- Formed: January 1, 1998

Government
  - Mayor: Andrea Matrosovs
  - MP: Terry Dowdall (C)
  - MPP: Brian Saunderson (PC)

Area
  - Land: 284.65 km^{2} (109.90 sq mi)

Population (2021)
  - Total: 9,390
  - Density: 33/km^{2} (85/sq mi)
- Time zone: UTC-5 (EST)
  - Summer (DST): UTC-4 (EDT)
- Postal code: N0H 2P0
- Area code(s): 519, 226
- Highways: Highway 26
- Website: www.thebluemountains.ca

The Blue Mountains is a resort town in Grey County, Ontario, Canada, located where the Beaver River flows into Nottawasaga Bay. It is named for the Blue Mountain, and hence the economy of the town is centred on tourism, particularly on the Blue Mountain ski resort and private clubs including Georgian Peaks, Osler, Craigleith and Alpine Ski Club.

== History ==
The town was formed on January 1, 1998, when the Town of Thornbury was amalgamated with the Township of Collingwood. Thornbury is home to the architecturally unique L.E. Shore Memorial Library, named after the founding partner of the architectural practice of Shore Tilbe Irwin + Partners, and designed by the firm.

During the 2009 Southern Ontario tornado outbreak, a tornado passed through the Blue Mountains area on August 20. The tornado passed by Thornbury and hit Craigleith before moving out onto Georgian Bay.

== Geography ==
=== Communities ===
The primary population centres are Thornbury and the modern resort-style communities clustered around the foot of the escarpment near the ski resorts, commonly referred to as Blue Mountain Village. Additionally the town's territory also includes the rural communities of Banks, Camperdown, Castle Glen Estates, Christie Beach, Clarksburg, Craigleith, Duncan, Gibraltar, Swiss Meadows, Heathcote, Kolapore, Little Germany, Lora Bay, Loree, Ravenna, Red Wing, Slabtown, and Victoria Corners.

==== Thornbury ====
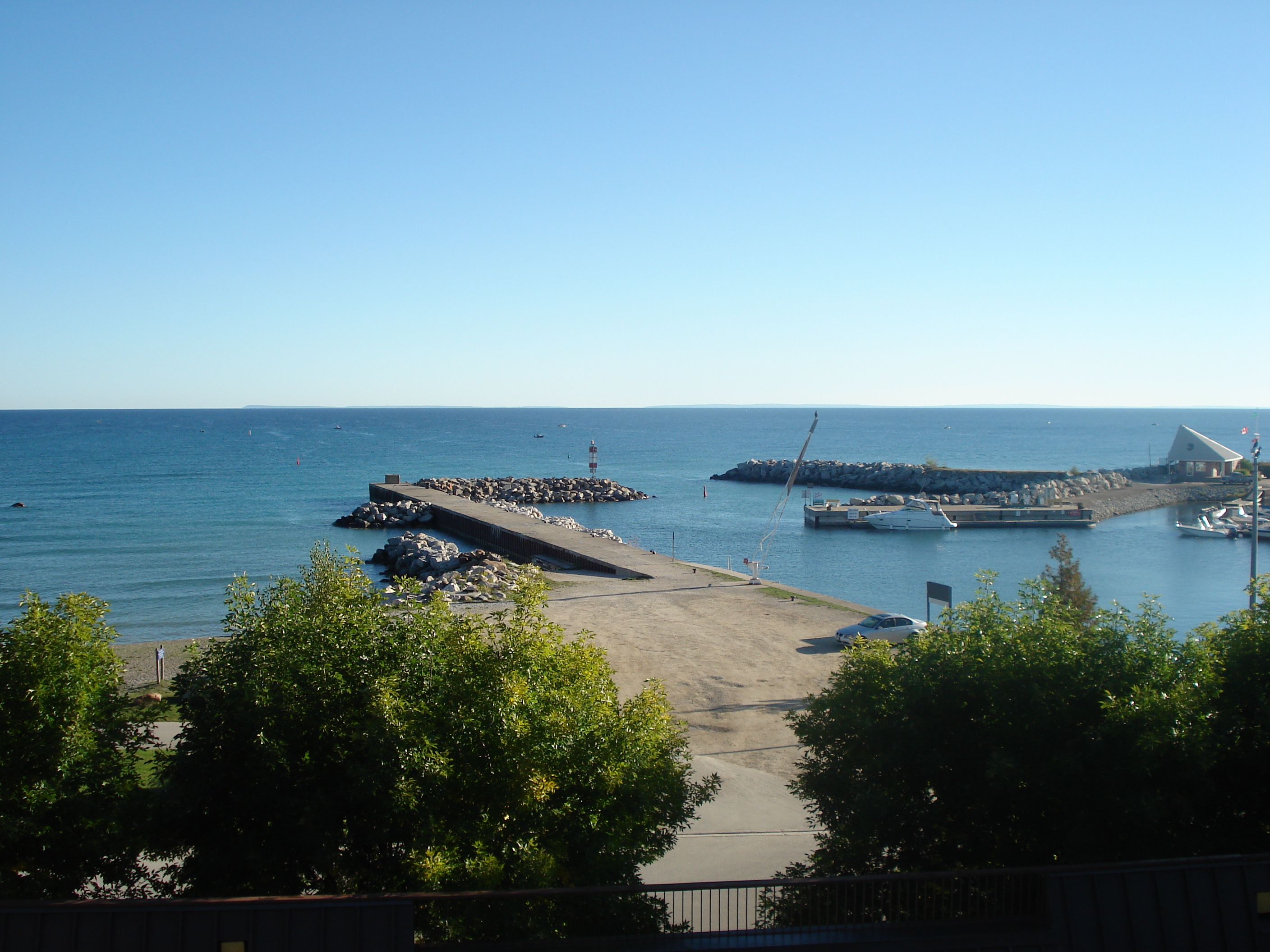
Thornbury harbour from the Royal Harbour Resort

Thornbury was first incorporated in 1831 and divided from Collingwood Township in 1887 as a separate administration. It existed as a separate municipality until 1998 when it remerged with Collingwood Township to form Town of The Blue Mountains municipality. The town was a shipping and processing centre for local agricultural produce especially apples through its harbour on Georgian Bay, Lake Huron. There was also a small fishing fleet that operated from the harbour and the post office dates from 1854.

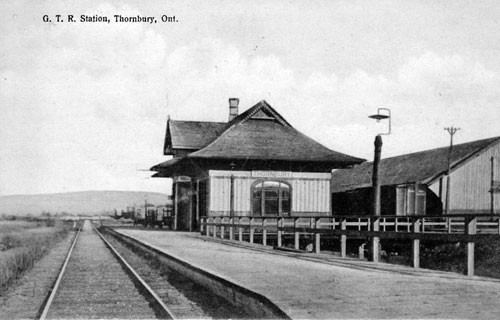
Thornbury's Grand Trunk Railway station c. 1910.

Rail service reached Thornbury on September 2, 1872, when the Northern Railway of Canada's North Grey Railway was built westward through Grey County from Collingwood to Meaford; the line reached Meaford later that year, in December. The line was originally planned to extend all the way to Owen Sound, but this vision went unrealized due to factors such as terrain, financial limitations, and competition from the Toronto, Grey and Bruce Railway, which reached Owen Sound in 1873. The railway was later part of the Grand Trunk Railway and Canadian National Railways (CNR) systems. Thereafter, it became known as the CN Meaford Subdivision. Regular passenger service ceased in 1960; the line itself was abandoned in 1985.

Many large late nineteenth century houses on tree lined streets characterize the town suburbs. Thornbury is home to the architecturally unique L.E. Shore Memorial Library, built in 1995 and named after the founding partner of the architectural practice of Shore Tilbe Irwin + Partners who designed it. In more recent years, Thornbury has become a winter and summer destination for individuals from across Ontario to vacation. The town also holds an annual Canada Day celebration that takes place on the main street.

=== Climate ===
Climate data for Thornbury, Ontario (1981−2010)
Month	Jan	Feb	Mar	Apr	May	Jun	Jul	Aug	Sep	Oct	Nov	Dec	Year
Record high °C (°F)	15.0 (59.0)	18.0 (64.4)	24.0 (75.2)	30.5 (86.9)	32.8 (91.0)	34.0 (93.2)	35.5 (95.9)	36.0 (96.8)	33.5 (92.3)	28.9 (84.0)	22.5 (72.5)	20.0 (68.0)	36.0 (96.8)
Mean daily maximum °C (°F)	−2.6 (27.3)	−1.5 (29.3)	2.9 (37.2)	10.2 (50.4)	16.6 (61.9)	22.0 (71.6)	24.8 (76.6)	24.0 (75.2)	20.1 (68.2)	13.2 (55.8)	6.5 (43.7)	0.6 (33.1)	11.4 (52.5)
Daily mean °C (°F)	−6.3 (20.7)	−5.4 (22.3)	−1.5 (29.3)	5.5 (41.9)	11.5 (52.7)	16.7 (62.1)	19.8 (67.6)	19.2 (66.6)	15.5 (59.9)	9.1 (48.4)	3.1 (37.6)	−2.7 (27.1)	7.0 (44.6)
Mean daily minimum °C (°F)	−9.9 (14.2)	−9.3 (15.3)	−5.8 (21.6)	0.9 (33.6)	6.2 (43.2)	11.4 (52.5)	14.8 (58.6)	14.3 (57.7)	10.8 (51.4)	4.9 (40.8)	−0.3 (31.5)	−5.9 (21.4)	2.7 (36.9)
Record low °C (°F)	−30.6 (−23.1)	−31.5 (−24.7)	−28.0 (−18.4)	−13.3 (8.1)	−3.3 (26.1)	0.6 (33.1)	5.0 (41.0)	3.9 (39.0)	−2.0 (28.4)	−5.0 (23.0)	−16.5 (2.3)	−26.0 (−14.8)	−31.5 (−24.7)
Average precipitation mm (inches)	100.0 (3.94)	68.4 (2.69)	64.0 (2.52)	65.3 (2.57)	82.7 (3.26)	79.1 (3.11)	72.1 (2.84)	78.2 (3.08)	95.9 (3.78)	87.3 (3.44)	99.6 (3.92)	99.4 (3.91)	991.9 (39.05)
Average rainfall mm (inches)	20.9 (0.82)	19.4 (0.76)	36.7 (1.44)	57.4 (2.26)	82.7 (3.26)	79.1 (3.11)	72.1 (2.84)	78.2 (3.08)	95.9 (3.78)	84.0 (3.31)	70.4 (2.77)	28.5 (1.12)	725.3 (28.56)
Average snowfall cm (inches)	79.1 (31.1)	49.0 (19.3)	27.4 (10.8)	7.9 (3.1)	0.0 (0.0)	0.0 (0.0)	0.0 (0.0)	0.0 (0.0)	0.0 (0.0)	3.3 (1.3)	29.2 (11.5)	70.8 (27.9)	266.6 (105.0)
Average precipitation days (≥ 0.2 mm)	18.9	13.3	12.5	12.6	12.0	10.6	9.5	10.8	13.2	15.8	16.3	17.6	163.0
Average rainy days (≥ 0.2 mm)	4.2	3.8	6.9	11.5	12.0	10.6	9.5	10.8	13.2	15.5	12.5	6.4	116.9
Average snowy days (≥ 0.2 cm)	15.9	10.6	7.0	2.2	0.0	0.0	0.0	0.0	0.0	0.67	5.0	12.3	53.6
Source: Environment Canada

== Demographics ==
In the 2021 Census of Population conducted by Statistics Canada, The Blue Mountains had a population of 9,390 living in 4,348 of its 7,396 total private dwellings, a change of 33.7% from its 2016 population of 7,025. With a land area of 284.65 km^{2} (109.90 sq mi), it had a population density of 33.0/km^{2} (85.4/sq mi) in 2021.

Canada census – The Blue Mountains, Ontario community profile

	2021	2016	2011
Population	9,390 (+33.7% from 2016)	7,025 (+8.9% from 2011)	6,453 (-5.5% from 2006)
Land area	284.65 km^{2} (109.90 sq mi)	287.24 km^{2} (110.90 sq mi)	287.23 km^{2} (110.90 sq mi)
Population density	33.0/km^{2} (85/sq mi)	24.5/km^{2} (63/sq mi)	22.5/km^{2} (58/sq mi)
Median age	58.8 (M: 58.8, F: 58.8)	57.6 (M: 57.7, F: 57.6)
Private dwellings	7,396 (total) 4,348 (occupied)	6,477 (total) 3,271 (occupied)	6,200 (total)
Median household income	$101,000	$78,490

References: 2021 2016 2011

Historical census populations – The Blue Mountains, Ontario

Year	Pop.	±%
1991	5,036	—
1996	5,667	+12.5%
2001	6,116	+7.9%
2006	6,825	+11.6%

Year	Pop.	±%
2011	6,453	−5.5%
2016	7,025	+8.9%
2021	9,390	+33.7%

Source: Statistics Canada

Population trend:

- Population total in 1996: 5667
  - Collingwood (township): 3904
  - Thornbury (town): 1763
- Population in 1991:
  - Collingwood (township): 3390
  - Thornbury (town): 1646

Canada 2016 Census		Population	% of Total population
Visible minority group Source:	South Asian	0	0
Visible minority group Source:	Chinese	20	0.2
Visible minority group Source:	Black	0	0
Visible minority group Source:	Filipino	20	0.2
Visible minority group Source:	Latin American	0	0
Visible minority group Source:	Southeast Asian	0	0
Visible minority group Source:	Other visible minority	60	0.8
Total visible minority population		100	1.4
Aboriginal group Source:	First Nations	80	1.1
Aboriginal group Source:	Métis	30	0.4
Aboriginal group Source:	Inuit	0	0
Total Aboriginal population		105	1.4
White		6,820	97.1
Total population		7,025	100

== Recreation ==
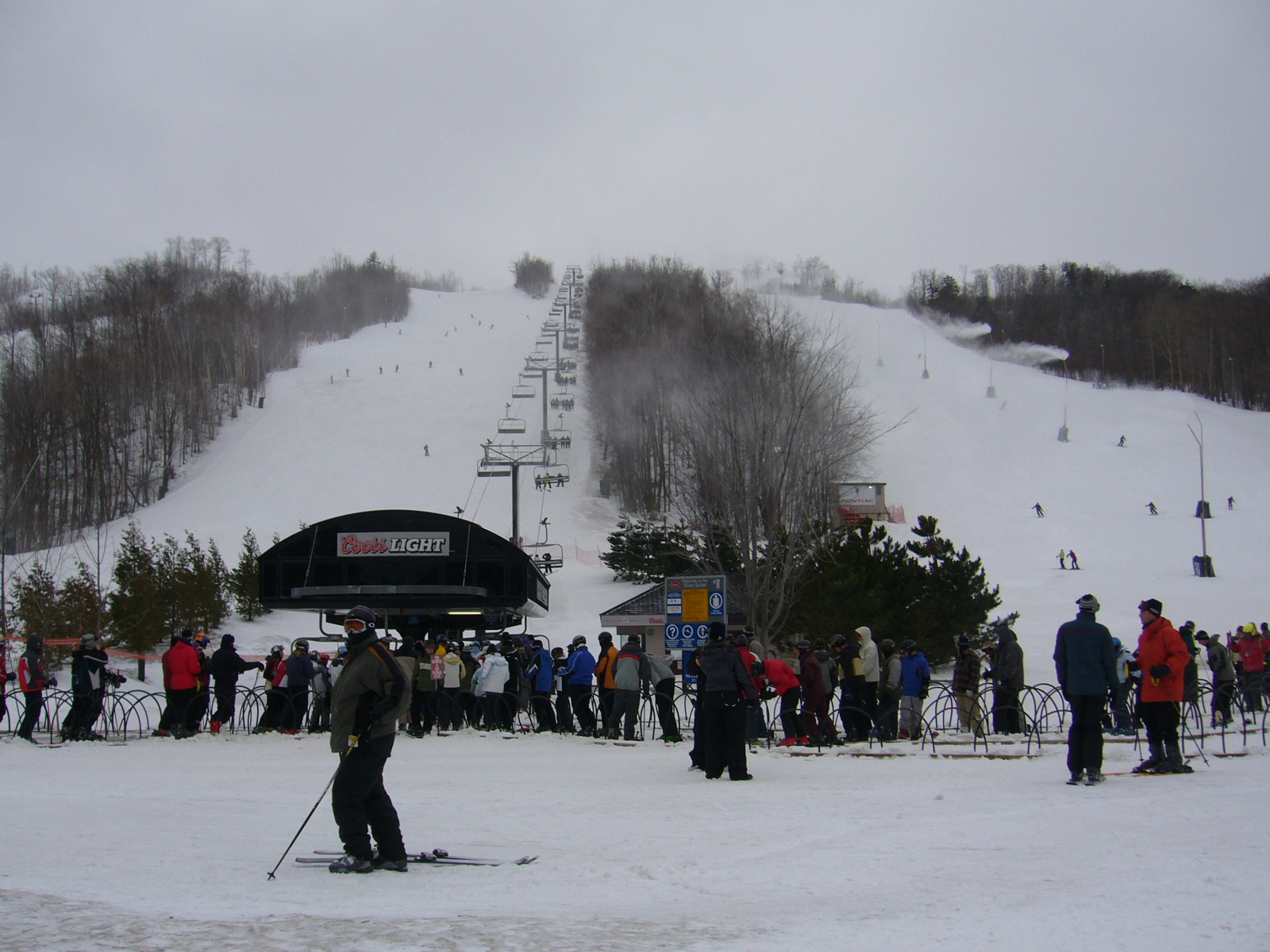
The eponymous Blue Mountains

The Blue Mountains has a host of recreational activities for all seasons. Most notably is the winter skiing, snowboarding, snowshoeing and cross-country skiing. In the summer there is hiking, downhill/cross-country biking, a scenic putting course, the Ridge Runner coaster and events such as Met Con Blue. The Village at Blue Mountain has boutiques, coffee shops, restaurants, hotels and chalets, as well as golf courses within walking distance. Less than a 5-minute drive away there is the Scandinave Spa, situated on 25 acres of natural Ontario birch, as well as the Scenic Caves.

Craigleith Provincial Park is located along Highway 26 near Blue Mountain resort.

The Bruce Trail passes through sections of the town. Nearby are the Kolapore area for mountain biking and cross-country skiing, Metcalfe Rock which is popular with rock climbers, and the Duncan Crevice Caves Nature Reserve.

== Notable residents ==
- Cecil Dillon – NHL hockey player of the 1930s for the New York Rangers and the Detroit Red Wings
- Captain Charles Stuart – Anglo-American abolitionist who helped freed slaves make their way to Ontario via the Underground Railroad
- Walter Trier - Czech-German illustrator
- Andrea Canning - journalist

== See also ==
- List of townships in Ontario
