= Shames Mountain Ski Area =

Ski resort in British Columbia, Canada

Coordinates: 54°29′03″N 128°57′13″W

Shames Mountain
- Interactive map of Shames Mountain
- Location: 35km West of Terrace, British Columbia
- Nearest city: Terrace, British Columbia
- Vertical: 488 m (1,601 ft)
- Top elevation: 1,189 m (3,901 ft)
- Base elevation: 700 m (2,300 ft)
- Skiable area: Trails: 57 ha/141 acres, Natural Glades: 45 ha/111 acres, Backcountry: ~3150ha/7800 acres
- Longest run: 4 km (2.5 mi)
- Lift system: 1 Double Chair (1500m/4920ft), 1 T-Bar (600m/1968ft), 1 Green Carpet Lift
- Snowfall: 1,200 cm (470 in)
- Snowmaking: No
- Night skiing: No
- Website: https://mymountaincoop.ca/

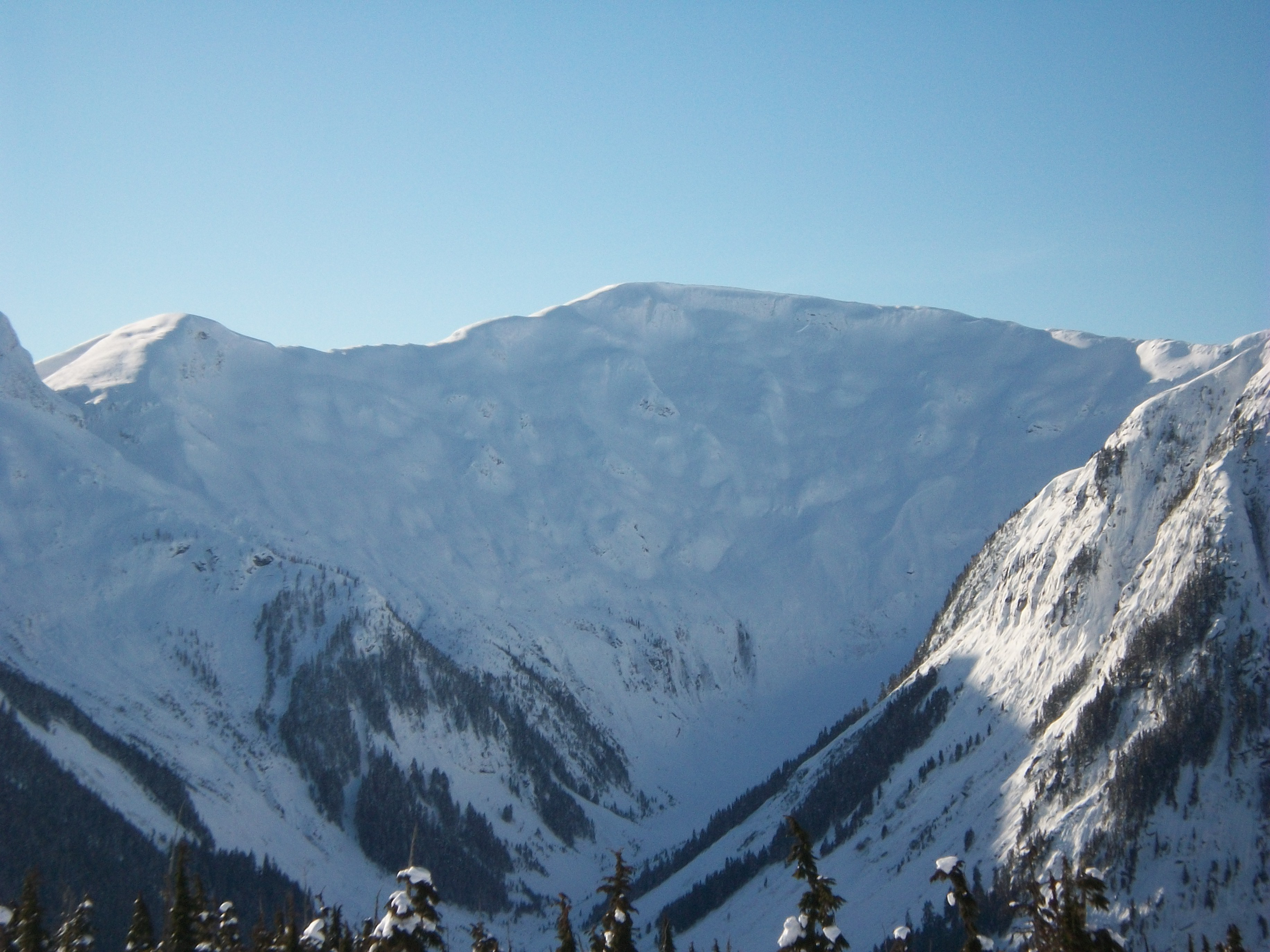
Shames Mountain

Shames Mountain Ski Area is a ski resort located 35 km (22 mi) west of the city of Terrace, British Columbia, Canada. The area's vertical drop is 488 m (1600') with a summit elevation of 1189 m (3900'), with one surface lift and one double chair. Annual snowfall at the summit is 1200 cm (475 inches).

Shames Mountain, the ‘little ski area that rocks’, tucked away near Terrace and Prince Rupert, BC, was put up for sale in 2008. In an effort to rally a large group of shareholders (aka skiers) to purchase, own and operate Shames Mountain, members of the international ski community Jamie Schectman and Shanie Matthews formed the Shames Mountain Co-op in 2009.

Another group called Friends of Shames, composed of local skiers and winter sports enthusiasts, also began to hold town hall meetings in the fall of 2009 in order to get a sense of what the surrounding communities wanted from their ski hill. They opened lines of communication with the former owners of Shames and held meetings with lawyers and consultants specializing in alternative business models. Through these consultations, the best model for Shames' future success was determined to be a non-profit co-operative. In 2010, Friends of Shames applied for and were awarded grant monies for feasibility studies and the development of a business plan. With these in hand, Friends of Shames officially launched the drive to create My Mountain Co-op in February 2011. Individuals, local businesses and corporations bought memberships and worked together to raise awareness within the region about the general benefits of running the ski area as a community service co-op (as opposed to having it close down for lack of a private buyer). Through fundraising efforts, membership shares, and corporate donations, MMC was able to enter a purchase agreement with the former owners - Shames Mountain Ski Corporation (SMSC), and began operating Shames for the first time for the 2011–2012 season. Late in 2012, tenure of the ski area was officially transferred from the provincial government to MMC, removing the last condition of the purchase agreement with SMSC. As of January 2013 MMC (and its membership) achieved the remarkable milestone of owning the Shames Mountain Ski Area.
