= Sunridge Ski Area =

Ski resort in Alberta, Canada

- Location within Edmonton Location within Alberta Location within Canada
- Location: 17 Street, Yellowhead Trail
- Nearest city: Edmonton
- Coordinates: 53°33′51″N 113°22′14″W
- Skiable area: 72 acres (0.3 km^{2})
- Trails: 12; 20% - Easiest; 35% - More Difficult; 45% - Most Difficult
- Longest run: 600 ft (180 m)
- Lift system: -2 Chairlift: 3 Magic Carpet
- Snowfall: 114 cm (45 in)
- Snowmaking: 100% coverage
- Night skiing: Yes
- Website: https://www.skisunridge.com/

Sunridge Ski Area is located in the Strathcona Science Provincial Park, a provincial park in Strathcona County on the eastern slopes of the North Saskatchewan River valley.

== History ==
The ski area was opened in 1980 as part of the Strathcona Science Provincial Park. In 1983, the area was contracted to a private company and renamed Hidden Ridge Ski Area. In 1988, the ski area management changed again, and was renamed to its current Sunridge Ski Area.

In 2007, following the addition of earth fill to the area between the original Orange and Red T-bars, the original Silverlode triple chairlift from Red Mountain Resort was installed.
