= Parc du Mont-Comi =

Outdoor recreation center in St-Donat, Quebec, Canada

Coordinates: 48°27′58″N 68°12′38″W

- Interactive map of Parc du Mont-Comi
- Location: Saint-Donat, La Mitis Regional County Municipality, Quebec, Canada
- Nearest city: Mont-Joli, Rimouski
- Trails: 26
- Lift system: 4 (1 T-bar, 1 Quadruple Chairlift, 1 Double Chairlift, 1 Pauma)
- Snowmaking: Yes
- Night skiing: None
- Website: Parc du Mont-Comi

Parc du Mont-Comi is an outdoor recreation center situated in St-Donat in the Bas-Saint-Laurent region of Quebec. In the winter time it is a ski resort, in the summer there is canoe, kayak, horseback riding and hiking and in the fall there are rides in the chairlift and mountain biking on trails maintained by a group of volunteers.

== History ==
The Parc du Mont-Comi debuted its operations on 17 January 1973. Before getting there, it had to go through many steps such as the formation of a corporation in 1967 by a group of promoters in the area. A subscription campaign enabled them to collect the money necessary to buy the land and to start preparing the first runs on the mount that had the original name of "Mont Camille".

Because they did not have the money necessary to buy the equipment necessary to maintain the runs, they called on snowmobilers to "groom" the runs with tree trunks. Because it was more or less effective, they borrowed $3500 to buy a "Muskeg" to maintain the runs with farm rollers.

In 1972, they installed the first mechanical lift in the four school runs, the T-Bar. In the fall of 1973 they installed the first chairlift and five new runs.

In its first year of operation in 1973, the Parc du Mont-Comi operated with an approximated budget of $85,000 and had six employees. At that time, a day pass cost $2.50 for an adult and $1.50 for a student. The operations budget had a major growth in the '80s to about 1.3 million dollars.

Because one of the objectives of the Parc du Mont-Comi was to render available to everyone services and equipment for outdoor activities year-round, in summer of 1975 it opened the "Camp Soleil et Verdure". The presence of the camp brought a lot to the center. Many infrastructures (dormitories, welcome chalet) were built and subsidized because of the camp.

Over the years, many employees and many volunteers contributed to the development of the Parc du Mont-Comi. In fact, the second general director (1985–1989) was M. Guy Desrosiers, who is now general director of Mont-Ste-Anne.

=== Second Chance ===
In May 1998, the Parc du Mont-Comi corporation declared bankruptcy because of accumulated debt. The mountain was then bought by M. Denis Roussel and his brothers in September 1998. M. Roussel had worked at the Parc du Mont-Comi since he was 15 years old. He went from Chairlift Operator to Director of Mountain Operations. He was born and grew up at the base of the mountain. The land around Mont-Comi belonged to his father Xavier Roussel. For the love of the mountain he gave it a second chance.

== Ski Boom ==
Since its opening in 1973, every year there is the annual party called the Ski Boom. It is held on the Saturday before Easter weekend and it is characterized by the fact that all skiers must dress-up. A costume contest is organized. There are also many other activities throughout the day.

== Runs ==
There are 26 maintained runs and 5 back country trails. It has a run "Le Mur" that is at 35°. There is no night skiing.

== Telemark ==
The Telemark club is now at its 24th season ('06–'07). Its objective is to facilitate exchanges between adepts of this style of skiing and to support the development of telemark. Its structure is simplified to the maximum with only a coordinator and some people responsible for specific activities.

=== Telemark Festival ===
The Telemark club also organizes one of the biggest telemark festivals in Eastern Canada which offers clinics in different areas such as moguls, off-trail and also has clinics for beginners who just want to try out telemark for a weekend.
