= Scenic Caves Nature Adventures =

Tourist attraction in Ontario, Canada

Scenic Caves Nature Adventures is a natural attraction and outdoor recreation facility located in the town of The Blue Mountains, Ontario, Canada, near Collingwood. Located on the Niagara Escarpment, the site features a network of caves, crevasses, forest trails, and scenic viewpoints overlooking Georgian Bay. The attraction is known for its natural caves, suspension footbridge, and location within the Niagara Escarpment UNESCO World Biosphere Reserve. The attraction has operated since 1932 and has developed from a guided cave tour into a year-round outdoor recreation destination.

== History ==
The caves and rock formations at Scenic Caves formed over geological time through erosion and glacial activity. The Scenic Caves property is situated on the Niagara Escarpment, a geological formation that began developing during the Ordovician Period approximately 450 million years ago, when the region was covered by a shallow tropical sea. Layers of limestone and dolostone deposited during this period later became exposed through erosion and glacial activity. During the last Ice Age, retreating glaciers carved deep fissures, crevasses, and caves into the escarpment's bedrock. These natural features, together with forests and panoramic viewpoints overlooking Georgian Bay, form the basis of the attraction today. Scenic Caves also contains mature hardwood forest, limestone cliffs, and habitat for a variety of native plant and animal species characteristic of the Niagara Escarpment.

The area is located within the traditional territory associated with the Petun First Nation, who historically lived along the Niagara Escarpment. Prior to its development as a tourist attraction, the property was settled and operated as a farm. There are a total of 17 unique geological features carved by glacial ice. According to local tradition, one cave that is known as the Natural Refrigerator remains cool even in summer heat.

In 1932, Alfred Staples began promoting the site as a tourist attraction by offering guided tours of the caves. The Staples family continued operating the attraction for several decades before ownership changed in the 1990s. In 1993, businessman Rob Thorburn acquired the property and expanded the attraction with additional outdoor recreation activities. The suspension bridge opened in 2003.

== Tourism and recreation ==
The main attraction at Scenic Caves is a series of caves, caverns, and crevasses. The site includes trails through forested areas, geological formations, and viewpoints overlooking Georgian Bay and the surrounding landscape. The property is situated on approximately 370 acres of land and includes forest ecosystems characteristic of the Niagara Escarpment.

Since opening as a tourist attraction, Scenic Caves has expanded to include seasonal outdoor activities. Scenic Caves operates as a year-round outdoor recreation facility offering hiking trails, geological tours, suspension bridge access, cross-country skiing, snowshoeing, and zip line experiences. Family-oriented attractions are also available during the summer season such as gemstone mining and mini golf. The suspension bridge may be accessed by hiking trails or seasonal wagon transportation. The suspension footbridge spans 420 feet (130 m) across the escarpment at a height of approximately 82 feet (25 m). It is described as the longest suspension footbridge in southern Ontario. The zip line is capable of reaching speeds of approximately 70 km/h.

The property includes scenic lookouts, offering panoramic views of Georgian Bay and approximately 10,000 km² of the surrounding landscape. Several caves and crevasses descend to depths of approximately 70 feet (21 m).

== Recognition ==
The attraction has been recognized as a Canadian Signature Experience and an Ontario Signature Experience by tourism organizations.
