= Mont Olympia =

Ski school and resort in Canada

Sommet Olympia
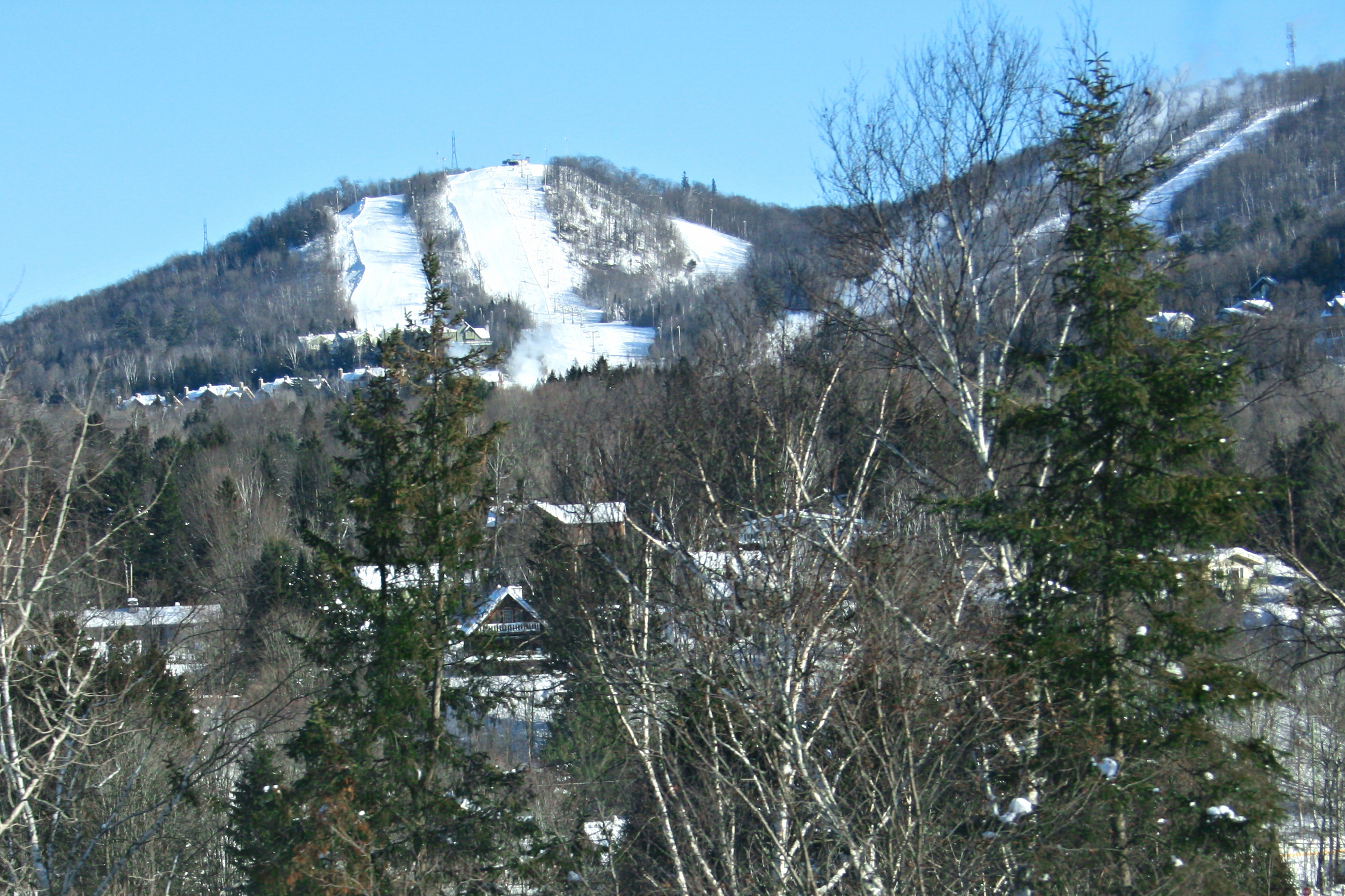
- Interactive map of Sommet Olympia
- Location: Piedmont, Quebec, Canada
- Nearest city: Saint-Sauveur
- Coordinates: 45°54′51″N 74°07′26″W
- Vertical: 656 ft (200 m)
- Top elevation: 1,443 ft (440 m)
- Base elevation: 787 ft (240 m)
- Skiable area: 80 acres (0.3 km^{2})
- Trails: 37
- Lift system: 6 total 3 quadruple chair 1 magic carpet 2 double T-bars
- Lift capacity: 8,200 skiers/hr
- Night skiing: 19 out of 37 trails
- Website: Sommet Olympia

Sommet Olympia is a ski school and resort in Quebec, Canada. The resort is located not far from Montreal, in the Laurentians. According to ski express magazine, Mont Olympia is "the best" ski mountain for beginners. The resort has 140 acres (0.57 km^{2}) of skiable terrain with 6 ski lifts and a vertical drop of 200 meters.

Sommet Olympia replaced a 1978-built triple chairlift by "a brand-new 4-seater chairlift with loading carpet", the "Apollo," for the 2023-2024 ski season.
