= Moonstone, Ontario =

Moonstone
- Unincorporated community
- Location within Ontario
- Coordinates: 44°39′20″N 79°39′49″W
- Country: Canada
- Province: Ontario
- County: Simcoe County
- Township: Oro-Medonte
- Time zone: UTC-5 (Eastern (EST))
  - Summer (DST): UTC-4 (EDT)
- Area code: 705

Moonstone is an unincorporated community in Oro-Medonte, a township in Simcoe County, Ontario, Canada. Moonstone is located 20 minutes north of Barrie and 15 minutes from Orillia. Moonstone is also accessible via Highway 400, and is a popular destination for skiers, snowboarders and winter enthusiasts visiting nearby Mount St. Louis Moonstone Ski Resort. The community has an elementary school and a community park which includes basketball courts, climbing structures, swings, and a football field. The community hosts a variety of annual events including a Santa Claus parade and an Easter egg hunt.
