= Bee Hive Ski Races =

Between 1961 and 1967, a series of annual giant slalom ski races were held in Canada. The races had a large prize pool and attracted the best skiers from around the world. Over 4000 spectators attended the races and the event and results were reported in most newspapers between London ON and Montreal QC at the time. The races were sponsored by the St. Lawrence Starch Company. The St. Lawrence Starch Company was the manufacture of "Bee Hive Corn Syrup".

1961 - Georgian Peaks Ski Club

1962 -

1963 - Devil's Glen Ski Club Winner - Ernst Hinterseer (Austria)

1964 - Devil's Glen Ski Club Winner - Ernst Hinterseer (Austria)

1965 - Lake Louise

1966 -

1967 -
