= Mount Antoine =

Mountain in Canada

Antoine Mountain
- Location within Ontario
- Location: Northeastern Ontario, Canada
- Nearest city: Mattawa
- Coordinates: 46°22′05″N 78°44′05″W
- Vertical: 630 ft (192 m)
- Trails: 15
- Lift system: 2 lifts: 1 quad, 1 handle tow
- Snowfall: 3m/year
- Website: antoinemountain.ca

Antoine Mountain is a downhill ski area located north of Mattawa in Northeastern Ontario, Canada. It holds the record for the longest ski run in Ontario with 2.9 kilometres long.

The public facilities include a main chalet (which includes seating, storage, washrooms, and a cafeteria), a rental building, and the Canadian Ski Patrol quarters.

The hill opened in 1975 as Mount Antoine and was run jointly with the Laurentian Ski Hill until 2000, which when it was closed.

In 2015, the hill reopened with a renovated facility and a new Doppelmayr quad lift.

== See also ==
- List of ski areas and resorts in Canada
