= Horseshoe Valley Resort =

Ski resort in Ontario, Canada

- Location within Southern Ontario Location within Ontario
- Location: Oro-Medonte, Ontario, Canada
- Nearest city: Barrie, Orillia,
- Coordinates: 44°33′7″N 79°40′19″W
- Vertical: 94 metres (308 ft)
- Top elevation: 406 metres (1,332 ft)
- Base elevation: 312 metres (1,024 ft)
- Skiable area: 24.7 hectares (61 acres)
- Trails: 29
- Longest run: 670 metres (2,200 ft)
- Lift system: 8 (1 detachable six-person, 2 triples, 3 doubles, 1 surface, 1 Magic Carpet)
- Lift capacity: 11,400/hour
- Snowfall: 223 cm (88 in)
- Snowmaking: 75%
- Night skiing: Yes
- Website: www.horseshoeresort.com

Horseshoe Valley Resort, formerly Horseshoe Valley Ski Club, is an Ontario ski resort and four season vacation destination. Located north of Barrie, the resort is 110 km north of Toronto. The resort enjoys a long ski season due to snowmaking abilities. Acquired by Freed Hotels and Resorts in 2021, Horseshoe Valley Resort is spread out over 680 acres (280 ha) of land. The resort offers 29 ski runs, over 30 kilometres of Nordic trails, 18-hole Valley golf course, Amba Spa, 101 rooms at the on-site inn, 40 condo-style suites, two year-round restaurants, 16,000 square feet (1,500 m^{2}) of meeting and banquet facilities, indoor and outdoor swimming pools, a full gym, and over 25 miles (40 km) of trails connected to the Copeland Forest suitable for hiking, biking and snowshoeing.

The resort is known for four-season activities including on-site mountain biking, snow tubing, cross country biking, Nordic skiing, snowshoeing and fat biking.

Horseshoe Valley is the area between a horseshoe-shaped series of hills with the open ends of the U facing north. Horseshoe Valley Road runs through the middle of the hills, cutting its northern ends off from the base of the U on the south side of the road. The club was originally started by Bill Lohuaru on the southern side of the road.

== History ==
In the early 1960s, Bill Lohuaru, a home builder from the Toronto area was looking for a site to build a ski resort and settled on Horseshoe Valley, at the time locally known as Hungry Hollow, due to its elevation as it sits on the Oro Moraine, natural "U" shape facing west and proximity to Georgian Bay.

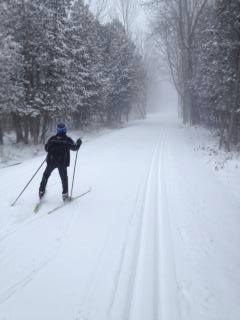
Nordic ski trail at Horseshoe Valley Resort.

In 1962, the first ski season at Horseshoe Valley opened with five alpine slopes, a t-bar, four rope tows and a small base lodge. The improving economy and dramatic improvements in ski equipment turned skiing into a major sport, which in turn, fueled the resort's development, quickly growing it from a 200-acre footprint to 1,600 acres spanning the townships of Oro and Medonte. More T-bars and chair lifts were added throughout the 1960s and in 1967, the first snowmaking machine was installed. With the expansion of the alpine slopes came an increased interest in Nordic skiing, and in 1964, 10 km of Nordic trails were introduced through the nearby Copeland Forest.

In 1972, the idea of developing the property into a 'year-round' resort was being considered and two skiers at the time also happened to be Canada's two premier golfers, George Knudson and Al Balding. With their help, Rene Muylaert was commissioned to design the first golf course layout, to be built by Evans Construction. in 1974, the back nine of the Valley Golf Course was opened and the 18-hole course as it stands today was complete by 1975.

Throughout this same time, the Oro-Medonte region was experiencing an expansion of its own. An internal road network developed, building lots were for sale and homes were being constructed. In the late 1970s, the Horseshoe Condominium project was completed.

In 1979, Bill Lohuaru brought on six new partners. The Board of Directors identified a need for short-term accommodation and a 40-unit vacation ownership project was completed in 1982 along with a swimming pool, tennis courts, indoor recreational facilities and restaurant. In 1984, night skiing was opened and during the 1980s the ski hill continued to expand. In 1987, the Inn at Horseshoe opened with 102 rooms, and indoor recreation centre and dining at Silks Restaurant. In 1989, a high-speed chairlift opened.

In 1989, Medonte Mountain (another ski club on the north western arm of the U-shaped series of hills) was purchased by Horseshoe Valley and turned into a new private area called Heights of Horseshoe. This private area is used for family skiing and a built out has been developed in the area. The hill features 8 chairlifts, including a fixed-grip quad, as well as a rope tow and magic carpet for beginners. The lifts serve 29 marked runs in total. The Heights features another 28 runs served by four lifts.

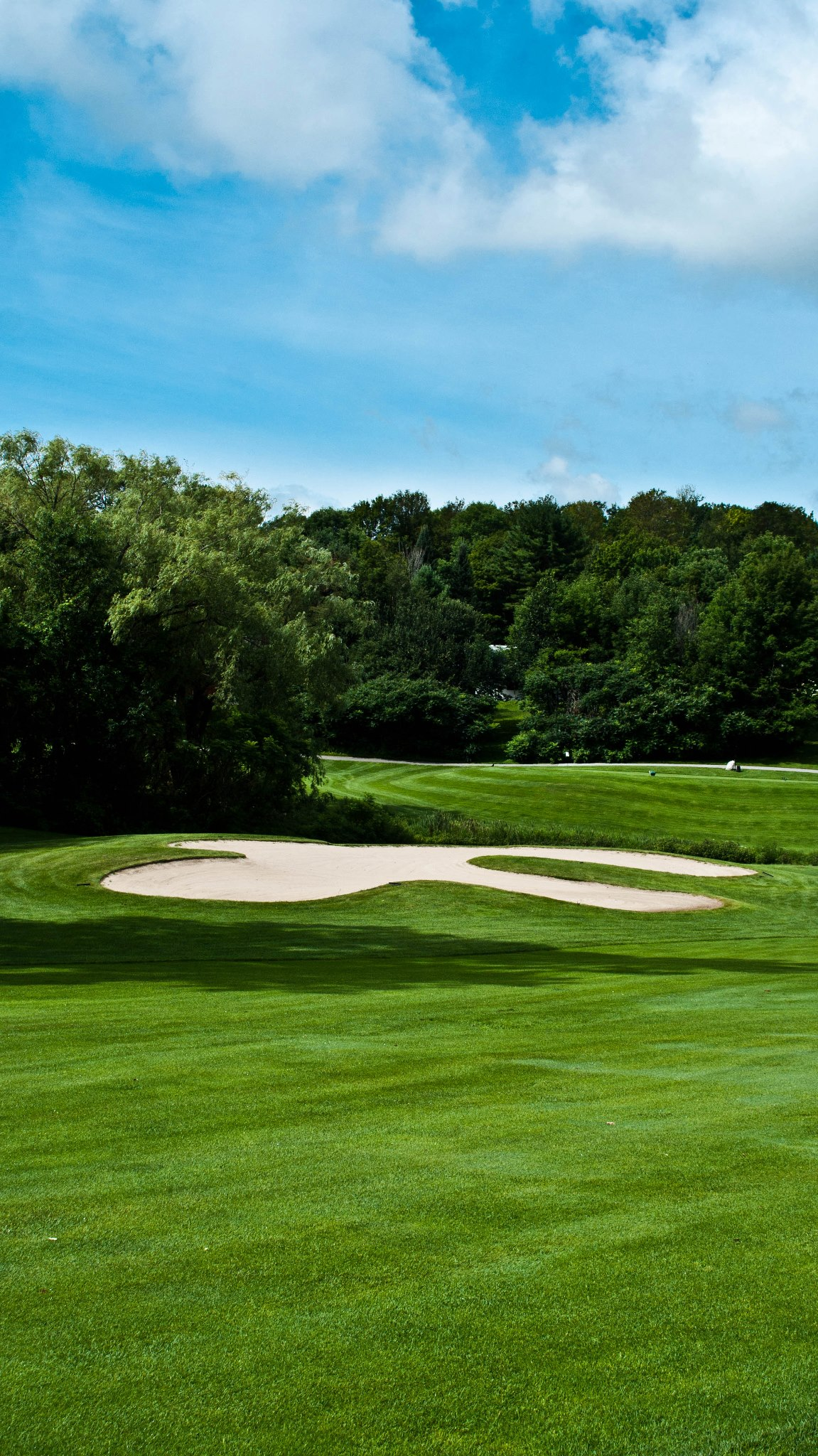
Highlands Golf Course was opened at the resort in 1991.

In 1991, construction began on the 18-hole Highlands Golf Course, which opened its first nine holes and driving range the same year. In 1997, Thunder Valley (now known as Red Horse Express) tubing park opened with four runs.

=== 21st century ===
In 2006, Horseshoe Highlands golf course hosted the PGA of Canada Tour Championships.

In 2007, Horseshoe was acquired by Skyline International Development Inc.

In 2010, Horseshoe Adventure Park opened with summer tubing, Ogo, mini putt, climbing wall, zip line and a skate park. In the same year, the resort also opened a downhill mountain biking course with four trails. In 2011, the Red Horse Maze was added to the Adventure Park. The zip flyer attraction was redesigned in 2012 to increase its capacity and speed.

In 2013, the resort completed a $4 million renovation of its 101 hotel rooms at the Inn at Horseshoe and 270 square metres of meeting space. The Adventure Park was also expanded that year to include the Red Horse Mining attraction. Later in the year, an 800-foot carpet lift, Kimble's Karpet, was added to the beginner ski hill.

In 2016, a new high-speed six-pack chairlift was added to the main hill, replacing the 1989 Doppelmayr high-speed quad. The old chairlift was removed in 2017. In 2017, a new artificial lake was added, for use in the summer. The snowmaking system at the resort was improved. In 2021, Horseshoe was acquired by Freed Hotels and Resorts.

== Skiing ==
Horseshoe Valley Resort currently operates four chairlifts, including one high-speed detachable, and one surface lift. 29 trails over approximately 30 kilometres are offered, including one terrain park. Night skiing is offered during the winter season between 4:30pm and 9pm.

== See also ==
- List of golf courses in Ontario
- List of ski areas and resorts in Canada
