= Kawartha Nordic Ski Club =

Coordinates: 44°37′12.36″N 78°7′54.84″W

Kawartha Nordic at sunset

The Kawartha Nordic Ski Club (KNSC) is a Nordic ski area located in North Kawartha township, Peterborough County, Ontario. It was founded in 1976 by a group of avid cross country skiers in Peterborough, Ontario. Today, it offers over 40 kilometres of both classic and skate trails, as well as 10 km of snowshoe trails through scenic, Canadian Shield wilderness. KNSC is a not-for-profit organization, governed by a volunteer board of directors, and operated by numerous volunteers. The club has received funding from the Ontario Trillium Foundation, in 2002, 2007, 2011, and 2014 to improve trails and purchase grooming equipment.

== History ==
KNSC was founded in 1976 by a group of avid cross country skiers in Peterborough, Ontario and focussed on operation of the Kawartha Ski Tour. This event attracted skiers from across Ontario as a loppet running from Apsley to Buckhorn, a distance of 40 kilometres. A 16-acre (65,000 m^{2}) property was purchased by the club to secure access to ski trails that were developed around the ski tour. The tour was cancelled in the early 1990s due in part to inconsistent snow conditions. Marjorie Shephard's book "The Kawartha Nordic Ski Club 1974-2004, 30 Dedicated Years" details the club's history over this time.

With support of the Ontario Trillium Foundation, KNSC opened skating trails for the 2002-2003 season and membership grew steadily. The club was rapidly outgrowing its facilities and so in 2004, the Nordic Legacy campaign was initiated to purchase 350 acres (1.4 km^{2}) of land and build a new chalet. The club benefited from the generosity of the Church family who purchased the new property in 2004 on an interim basis to protect it from other uses. The Cossar Cabin and surrounding 16 acres (65,000 m^{2}) of land were sold in 2005. Construction of the new chalet continued through the winter of 2005-2006 and members went without a main chalet that year. By December 2006, the club opened a brand new square log chalet on the new Nordic legacy property immediately south of the old property. Also that year, 10 kilometres of snowshoe trails were opened. The next major expansion (again with funding from the Trillium Foundation) was to come in 2008 with the purchase of a Pisten Bulley groomer which greatly improved the quality of grooming and overall skiing experience. For the 2010-2011 ski season, hydro was installed at the club and Wild Rock Outfitters operated a ski shop in the parking lot offering rentals, lessons, and day passes. A third Trillium grant was received in 2011 for the purchase of a newer Pisten Bulley groomer.

In 2014, a fourth Trillium grant was received to expand youth programs and facilities. Lighting was installed on 2.5 km of trails surrounding the Woodfine Chalet. A well and septic were installed for washrooms to be located in a separate washroom building adjacent to the main chalet (the foundation was prepared in fall of 2014). Four staff positions were hired for the 2014-2015 season for day lodge attendant, groomer, head coach and youth program coordinator.

=== Ski seasons ===
Ski Season	Start date	End date	Length in Days*	Open Days	Comments
2009-2010	Dec 11, 2009	Mar 11, 2010	90		
2010-2011	Dec 14, 2010	Mar 18, 2011	94		
2011-2012	Dec 31, 2011	Mar 14, 2012	74		
2012-2013	Dec 23, 2012	Mar 29, 2013	96		
2013-2014	Dec 15, 2013	Apr 10, 2014	116		Last day of grooming was March 30
2014-2015	Jan 7, 2015	Apr 1, 2015	84		
2015-2016	Dec 30, 2015	Mar 10, 2016	71		
2016-2017	Dec 13, 2016	Mar 25, 2017	102		
2017-2018	Dec 16, 2017	Mar 27, 2018	101		
2018-2019	Nov 17, 2018	Apr 8, 2019	142	131	Last day of grooming was April 1. Closed Dec 14-25
2019-2020	Dec 6, 2019	Mar 20, 2020	105	95	
2020-2021	Dec 31, 2020	Mar 18, 2021	77	77	
2021-2022	Jan 8, 2022	Mar 20, 2022	71	70	
2022-2023	Dec 17, 2022	Apr 2, 2023	106	95	
2023-2024	Jan 13, 2024	Feb 27, 2024	45	36	
2024-2025	Dec 6, 2024	Mar 21, 2025	105	91	
2025-2026	Dec 7, 2025	Apr 1, 2026	115	102	Last day of grooming was March 29.

* Includes days mid-season where trails may be closed due to weather
