= Mount Timothy Ski Area =

Ski area in British Columbia, Canada

Coordinates: 51°54′56″N 121°15′13″W

Mount Timothy Ski Area is a small ski area located in the South Cariboo region of British Columbia, Canada, 30 km north of 100 Mile House and 18 km northeast of Lac La Hache

The area has a triple chairlift (the first in the south Cariboo), t-bar, platte lift and 2 Magic Carpet beginner lifts and has a vertical drop of 310m from a summit elevation of 1654m to a base elevation of 1370m. 35 runs range from Double black diamond to beginner terrain.
