= Stony Mountain Ski Area =

Ski area in Manitoba, Canada

Coordinates: 50°05′39″N 97°12′24″W

Stony Mountain Ski Area is a ski area in the Rural Municipality of Rockwood, just northeast of Stony Mountain, Manitoba, Canada and is 11 km (6.8 mi) north of the Perimeter Highway. The Ski hill is approximately 245 metres (800 ft) above sea level.

The ski hill has two lifts - one handle tow and one rope tow. The hill has a 30 metres (100 ft) vertical drop.
