= Alpine Ski Club of Toronto =

Alpine Ski Club of Toronto, commonly known as Alpine Ski Club, is a private ski and snowboard club and alpine ski area in the Town of The Blue Mountains, Ontario, Canada. Founded in 1960, the club is situated on the Niagara Escarpment and operates a ski area with 37 runs and five chairlifts. The club offers recreational and competitive programs in skiing and snowboarding.

== History ==
Alpine Ski Club was established in 1960 by families from the Toronto area. Before establishing a permanent ski area, the club operated as a travelling ski club, with members travelling to other ski areas to ski. The club subsequently established a permanent ski facility on the Niagara Escarpment near Collingwood, Ontario. The club is owned and governed by its members.

Members purchased farmland on the Escarpment and developed ski runs on areas considered unsuitable for farming because of their steep terrain. During the decades following its establishment, Alpine expanded its ski facilities, terrain, and lift infrastructure.

The club's early facilities included a clubhouse that opened in December 1964. The clubhouse remained in use for more than five decades before being replaced as part of a major redevelopment of the base area.

The current 45,000-square-foot clubhouse opened in 2016 and includes dining and social areas, a nursery, and facilities for competitive athletes. In 2018, CNN Travel included Alpine Ski Club on its list of the world's best private ski resorts.

== Ski area ==
Alpine Ski Club has terrain spread across three faces of the Escarpment. The club encompasses 384 acres, with 120 acres of groomed trails, and has a vertical elevation of 760 feet (230 m). It has 37 runs, ranging from beginner terrain to five double black diamond runs.

Alpine is also home to a competition-size halfpipe, described as the last remaining competition-size halfpipe in Ontario. The halfpipe is used for freestyle skiing and snowboarding.

== Programs and competition ==
Alpine Ski Club offers recreational and competitive programs in alpine skiing and snowboarding. The club's competitive programs include alpine ski racing, snowboard racing, and freestyle skiing and snowboarding. The club has also hosted and participated in organized ski racing competitions in Ontario. In 2018, Alpine Ski Club was named Club of the Year at the Ontario Ski Racing Awards presented by Alpine Ontario Alpin.

Several Alpine members have competed at the Olympic Games. Alpine members include Ben Heldman, who represented Canada at the 2026 Winter Olympics; Roni Remme, who represented Canada at the 2018 and 2022 Winter Olympics; Derek Livingston, who represented Canada at the 2014 and 2018 Winter Olympics; and Palmer Taylor, who represented Canada at the 2010 Winter Olympics.

== Amenities ==
The property includes hiking and snowshoe trails that are used year-round, in addition to the downhill ski terrain. The clubhouse is also used as an event venue outside the ski season, hosting weddings, corporate functions, and other private events. Other recreational amenities include an outdoor skating rink.

== See also ==
- List of ski areas and resorts in Canada
