= Mica Heliskiing Guides =

Backcountry heliskiing lodge in Canada

Coordinates: 52°11′52″N 118°26′12″W

Mica Heli Guides or Mica Heliskiing is a backcountry heliskiing lodge located on Kinbasket Lake across from Mica Dam in British Columbia, Canada. Mica Heli Guides is located about two hours drive north of the town of Revelstoke.

Mica Heli Guides was started in 2003 by Dan McDonald. Dan McDonald has been in the backcountry skiing business since 1986 with the founding of Island Lake Lodge.

Mica Heli Guides operates small group heliskiing.

The A-Star helicopters used are owned and operated by Arrow Helicopters. The Koala Helicopters are owned and operated by Skyline Helicopters.

== Geography ==
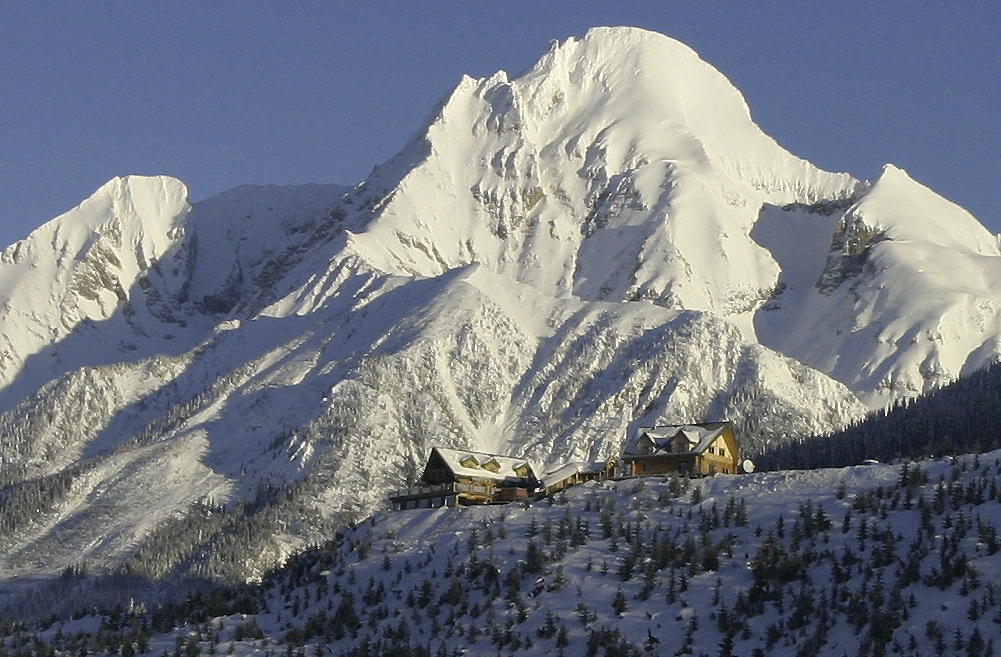
Mica Heliskiing Lodges

Mica Heliskiing's operating license encompasses approximately 300,000 acres on the western slopes of the Rocky Mountains in British Columbia, Canada. The lodge itself is located in the Rocky Mountain Trench which separates the Columbia Mountains to the west and the Rocky Mountains.

Mica Heliskiing is only accessible by helicopter in the winter and barge in the summer as there are no roads leading to the Mica Lodges. Mica is remotely located and off the grid. The nearest point of road access is located at the Mica Dam just past the town of Mica Creek and approximately two hours drive north of Revelstoke.
