= Murray Ridge Ski Area =

Ski resort in British Columbia, Canada

- Interactive map of Murray Ridge Ski Area
- Location: British Columbia, Canada
- Nearest city: Fort St. James, Canada
- Coordinates: 54°31′5″N 124°12′42″W
- Status: Active
- Opened: 1976
- Vertical: 530 m (1,740 ft)
- Top elevation: 1,231 m (4,039 ft)
- Base elevation: 700 m (2,300 ft)
- Snowfall: 300 centimetres (120 in)
- Website: Official website

Murray Ridge Ski Area, also known as Murray Ridge Ski Hill, is a small ski resort located on unceded Nak'azdli territory near the town of Fort St. James, British Columbia, Canada. The area has been in operation since the 1976-77 ski season and is managed by the Fort St. James Ski Club. The facilities include a 557 square metres (6,000 sq ft) day lodge. The area's T-Bar is reputed to be the longest in the world. Development of the area, which began with only two rope-tows, was assisted by Al Raine.

Base elevation is 700 metres (2,300 ft) with a summit elevation of 1,231 metres (4,039 ft), yielding a vertical drop of 530 metres (1,740 ft). There are 22 runs and an average annual snowfall of 300 centimetres (120 in). 20 kilometres (12 mi) of cross-country trails are adjacent to the ski hill.
