= Ski Valley (Minnedosa) =

Ski resort in Manitoba, Canada

Coordinates: 50.3197°N 99.8780°W

Ski Valley is a ski resort in Manitoba about seven kilometers (4.3 mi) north of Minnedosa, Manitoba. The slopes are on the valley of the Little Saskatchewan River. There are nine runs with a vertical drop of 80 meters. The hill is covered with snow making equipment ensuring about three months skiing every winter. The chalet and runs were built in 1975. Skiers get to the top on the double chair lift and beginners use the rope tow to ski on the bunny hill. Ski equipment and boards are available for rental as well as trained instructors.

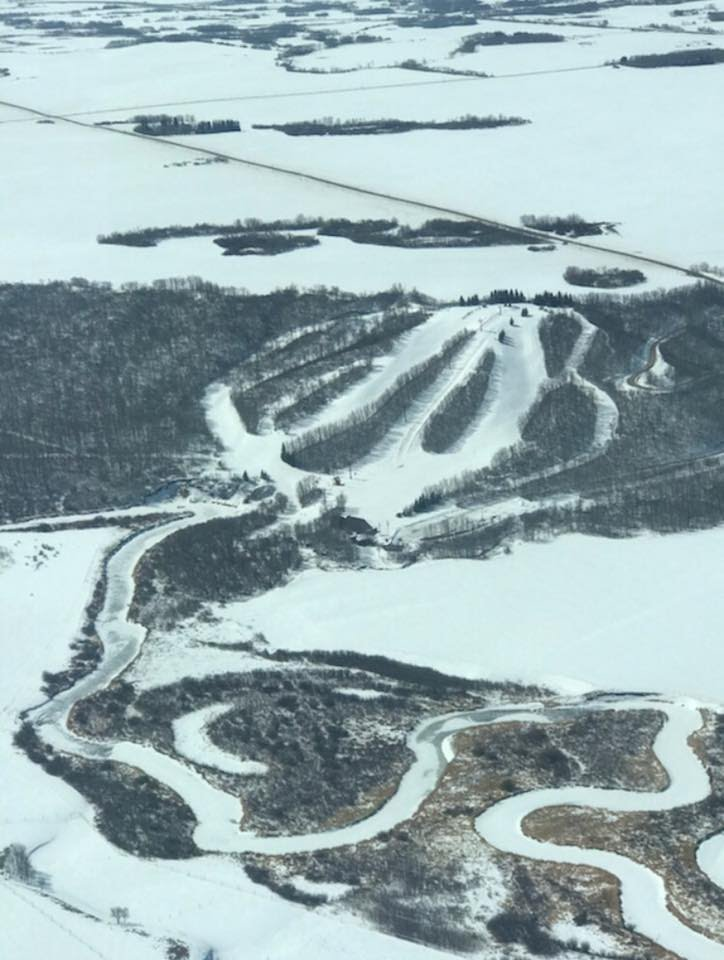
Ski Valley from the air
