= Hart Highlands Ski Hill =

Coordinates: 53°59′0″N 122°47′32″W

Hart Highlands Ski Hill is a small ski area in the Hart Highlands neighbourhood of Prince George, British Columbia, Canada.

== History ==
In 2021 with the addition of new snow making equipment and favorable weather allowed the hill to set a new record of 101 open days in a single season, exceeding the previous record of 100 set in the 2017-18 season. This record was again broken in the 2022-2023 season with a 112 day season.

A notable addition to the hill in 2020 was the Passenger Conveyor Carpet Lift, aka "the Magic Carpet," which allows beginners to ride the carpet to the top of a short learning run. This allows for beginners to spend more time learning and less time side stepping, or otherwise climbing up the small slope.
