= Purden Ski Village =

Coordinates: 53°54′03″N 121°53′10″W

Purden Ski Village is a ski resort located on Purden Mountain on the Yellowhead Highway 60 km east of Prince George, British Columbia, Canada. The area is operated by Purden Lake and Ski Resorts, which also owns Purden Lake Resort. The area has 1100+' of vertical drop and has 25 named runs, the longest of which (Lakeview) is two miles in length. The area enjoys 400 cm (160 in) of typically dry powder annually.
