= Beaver Valley Ski Club =

Private ski club in Ontario

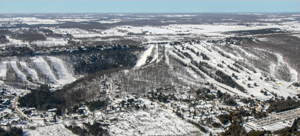
- Aerial view of the ski hill

- Location within Southern Ontario
- Location: Beaver Valley (Ontario), Canada
- Nearest city: Markdale, Collingwood
- Coordinates: 44°21′00″N 80°32′00″W
- Vertical: 155 m (509 ft)
- Trails: 28+ Beginner – 7 (23%); Intermediate – 15 (50%); Advanced – 3 (10%); Expert – 2 (7%); Freestyle Terrain – 3 (10%)
- Lift system: 6 (3 Quad, 1 Triple, 1 Double, 1 Magic Carpet)
- Terrain parks: 5 Beginner; Intermediate - Progression; Main Park; Rail Plaza; Snowboard/Ski Cross Course
- Snowmaking: 100%
- Night skiing: special events only
- Website: BeaverValley.ca

Beaver Valley Ski Club is a private skiing and snowboarding club located in Beaver Valley, Ontario, Canada.

It is situated on a steep sided section of the Niagara Escarpment adjacent to the Bruce Trail. It features some of the steepest runs and most diverse terrain in the region. The Club has 28 trails, five snowparks including a championship snowboard/ski cross course, national level mogul and slopestyle runs, glade skiing and a ski bowl. Its Playground snow park is one of the longest full featured snow park runs in Ontario. The Club has six lifts, two lodges, and a ski and snowboard shop with rentals.

The Club hosts various national and international series snowboard and freestyle ski events: the annual Beaver Valley Banked Slalom, Mogulmania, Beaver Valley Park Brawl, 2016 Canadian Junior Freestyle Ski Championship, 2016 and 2017 International Burton Qualifier Series, and 2022 Snowboard Nor-Am Cup Slopestyle, Big Air and Snowboard Cross.

Beaver Valley Ski Club has won two Sustainable Slopes awards from the National Ski Areas Association. Beaver Valley is the only Canadian snow resort to be awarded a Sustainable Slopes Award.

The mogul skiing scenes of the 2017 film Molly's Game were filmed at Beaver Valley Ski Club.

Beaver Valley Ski Club was featured on the cover of Snowboard Canada Magazine's 2018 Fall issue.

Beaver Valley Ski Club was nominated for Best Terrain Park Feature 2018 and Best Terrain Park Event 2018 and 2019 in Ski Area Management Magazine's annual Terrain Park Contest. The Beaver Valley Banked Slalom was nominated for Ski Area Management Magazine's Best Terrain Park Event 2022.

== History ==
The genesis of Beaver Valley Ski Club dates back to the 1930s as Ontario’s first ski destination, serviced by a weekend “ski train” running from the City of Toronto to the Town of Flesherton. In 1936, Beaver Valley hosted the Dominion of Canada National Ski Championship organized by the Toronto Ski Club. Seventy competitors from across Canada competed in downhill and slalom racing.

In 1949, Beaver Valley Ski Club was formally created with the installation of Canada’s longest rope tow. The Ontario Hydro Ski Club built a chalet at the bottom of Beaver Valley Club in 1961. The following year, the Austrian Ski Club built a chalet at the top of the resort. Beaver Valley Club became the first in Ontario to install floodlit night skiing in 1963.

The transition to its present day status as a member-funded Club started in 1967 to help further its development. In 1970, the Club expanded its terrain with the addition of the south facing Avalanche Bowl creating Ontario's steepest, sustained pitch. The Mogulmania event started in 1978 to showcase the bowl’s expert terrain and support the growing popularity of freestyle skiing. The event continues to be Canada’s longest running mogul contest. In 1984, the Club further expanded its terrain with the addition of the South Bowl providing six more runs, including “Free-fall”, Ontario’s only FIS-recognized World Cup moguls course.

During the 1990s, interest in snowboarding grew and the sport was introduced to the Club. In 1993 Beaver Valley snowboarders Paul Chapman and Vince Jorgenson finished first and second, respectively, at the Canadian National Snowboard Championship. Paul Chapman won the overall title at the 1994 Junior World Snowboard Championship.

In 1994 Beaver Valley Ski Club installed Ontario’s first FIS-homologated Freestyle Ski Aerials training site. In 2002 Beaver Valley skier Veronica Brenner won the silver medal in the Women’s Freestyle Ski Aerials event at the Salt Lake City Winter Olympics.

In 2005 Beaver Valley Ski Club created Ontario’s longest, dedicated snow park run to support the growing popularity of slope style, big air, rail, and park snowboarding and skiing. Beaver Valley Snow Parks were featured in a 2012 national edition of SBC Skier Magazine and a 2018 edition of Snowboard Canada Magazine. The parks were featured in the snowboard film May Flowers presented by Vans.

The Club published a hard cover book commemorating and chronicling the first 50 years of its history in 2018.

Many prominent snow sport athletes got their start at Beaver Valley. In 2022 snowboarders Michael Nazwaski and Jamie Behan were selected to the Canadian National Alpine Snowboard Next Gen Team. Jasmine Baird, who grew up snowboarding at the Club, was selected to the Canadian National Snowboard Slopestyle and Big Air Team. She finished 7th in Big Air and 15th in Slopestyle at the Beijing 2022 Winter Olympics, and later that year won the gold medal at the World Cup Big Air in Edmonton's Commonwealth Stadium. Skier Berkley Brown was selected to the Canadian National Moguls Next Gen Team. Other Beaver Valley athletes include Jesse Jarrett and Chris Fellner. Jesse was featured in the snowboard films Through My Fingers (2022), Tuesday's Child (2023) and Wishing Well (2024). He was also featured on the cover of King Snow Magazine along with an athlete interview. Chris Fellner was featured in the snowboard film Screaming About Nothing (2022).
