= Night skiing =

Snow sport

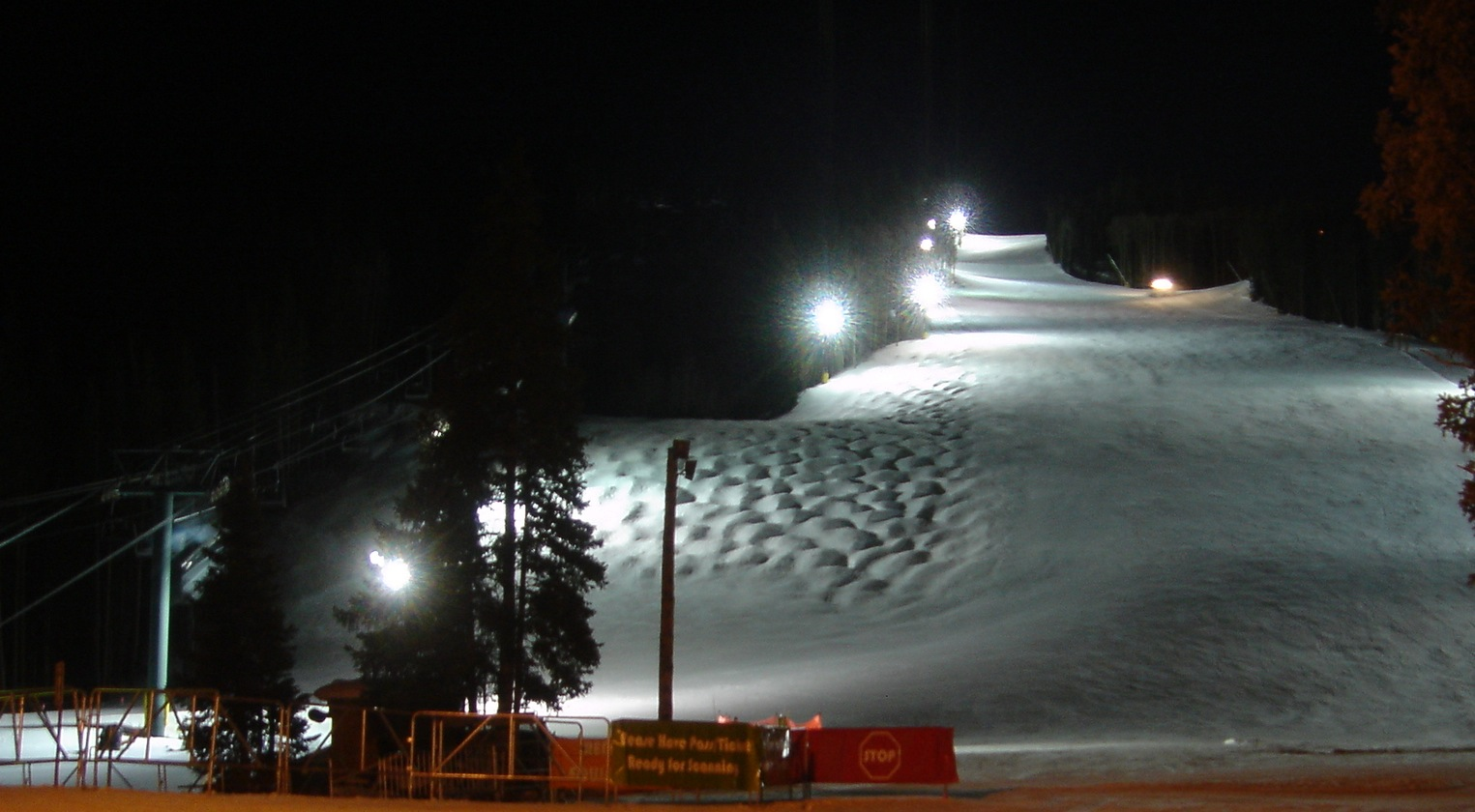
The River Run trail at Keystone Resort in Colorado under floodlights for night skiing

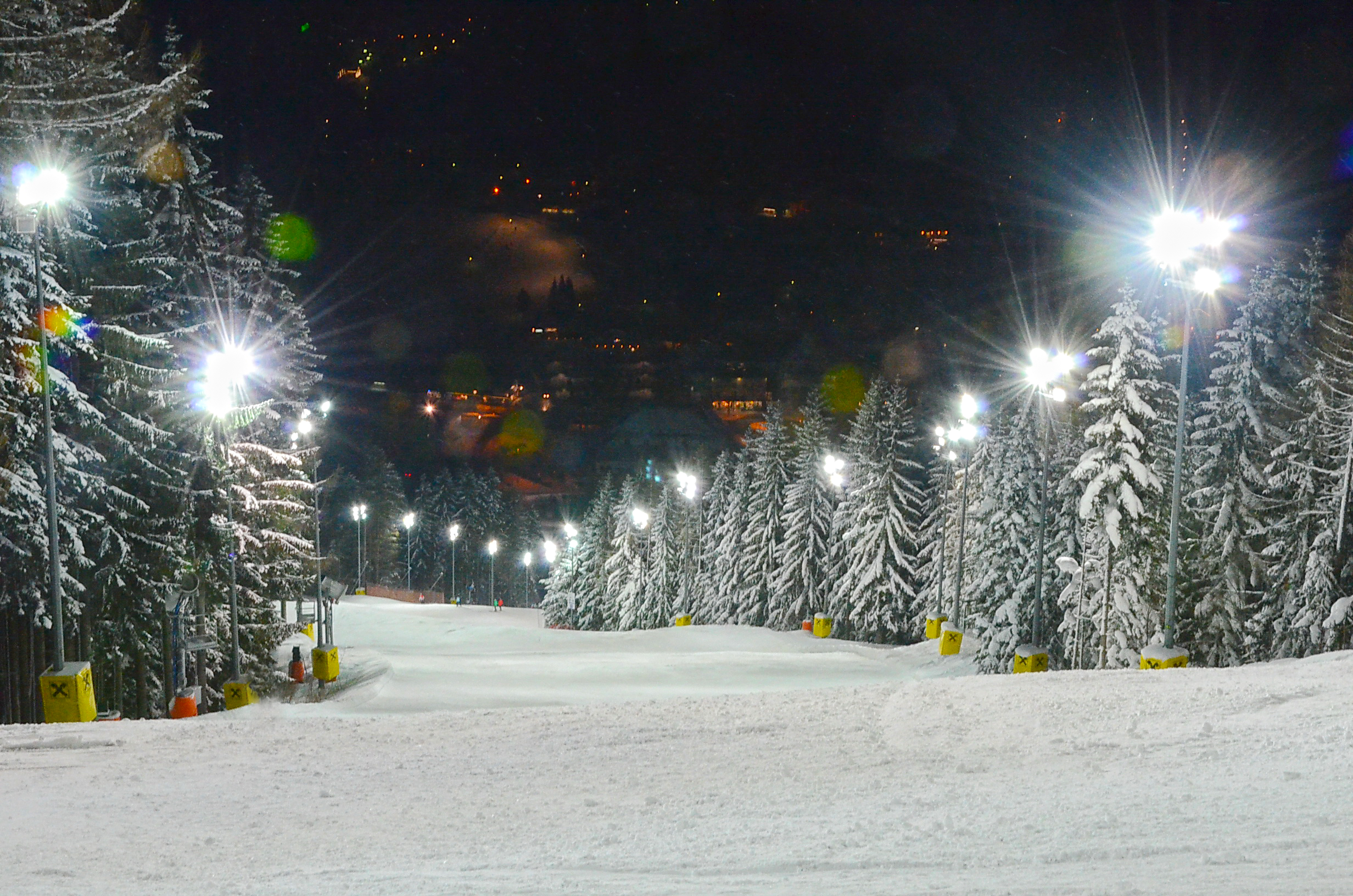
A floodlit piste in Semmering, Austria

Night skiing is the sport of skiing or snowboarding after sundown, offered at many ski areas. There are floodlights – with metal halide, LED or magnetic induction lamps – along the piste which allow for better visibility. The night skiing session typically begins around sunset, and ends between 8:00 PM and 10:30 PM.

Night skiing offers reduced price access versus daylight hours. Trails at night are normally not as busy as during the day, but there are usually fewer runs available. The trails also tend to be icier than during the day, due to melting and refreezing.

Starting in 1997 Planai in Austria has held a World Cup slalom competition at night.

A few ski resorts offer opportunities for night skiing wearing personal headlamps, or by the light of the full moon.

== History ==
Processions of skiers holding torches, lanterns or flares while skiing down a slope at night has been a scheduled event of winter festivals such as the Nordic Games since at least 1903. The dramatic spectacle of torchlight ski descents is a program element at the Holmenkollen Ski Festival, and ski resort holiday celebrations.

A torchlit ski race was held in Switzerland in 1920. In the 1925 Winter Carnival at Rumford, Maine, night ski jumping was included.

Chicopee Ski Club in Ontario Canada had lighted night skiing in 1935, with lights powered by car batteries.

Lighted slope skiing at Bousquet Ski Area in Pittsfield, Massachusetts began in 1936 thanks to a local partnership with General Electric. Other early lighted slopes include Fryeburg, Maine (1936), North Creek, New York (1937), Rossland, British Columbia (1937), Jackson, New Hampshire (1937), Hyak, Washington (1938), Juneau, Alaska (1938), Lake Placid, New York (1938) and Brattleboro, Vermont (1938).
