= 2016–17 in skiing =

From July 1, 2016 to April 23, 2017, the following skiing events took place at various locations around the world.

== Alpine skiing ==
=== World championships (alpine) ===
- January 22–31 2017 World Para Alpine Skiing Championships in (Italy) Tarvisio
  - For results, click here.
- February 6–19: FIS Alpine World Ski Championships 2017 in St. Moritz
  - Austria and Switzerland won 3 gold medals each. Austria won the overall medal tally.
- March 6–14: 2017 World Junior Alpine Skiing Championships in (Sweden) Åre
  - Austria and Switzerland won 3 gold medals each. Austria won the overall medal tally.

=== 2017 Alpine Skiing World Cup ===
- October 22, 2016 – March 19, 2017: FIS 2016–17 Alpine Skiing World Cup

October

- October 22 & 23: ASWC #1 in (Austria) Sölden
  - Giant slalom winners: (France) Alexis Pinturault (m) / (Switzerland) Lara Gut (f)

November

- November 12 & 13: ASWC #2 in (Finland) Levi
  - Slalom winners: (Austria) Marcel Hirscher (m) / (United States) Mikaela Shiffrin (f)
- November 23–27: ASWC #3 in (Canada) Lake Louise #1
  - All events cancelled, due to unfavorable weather conditions.
- November 26 & 27: ASWC #4 in (United States) Killington
  - Women's giant slalom winner: (France) Tessa Worley
  - Women's slalom winner: (United States) Mikaela Shiffrin
- November 29 – December 4: ASWC #5 in (France) Val-d'Isère #1
  - Note: This event was supposed to be held at Beaver Creek Resort, but it was cancelled, due to unfavorable weather conditions.
  - Men's super-G winner: (Norway) Kjetil Jansrud
  - Men's downhill winner: (Norway) Kjetil Jansrud
  - Men's giant slalom winner: (France) Mathieu Faivre
- November 29 – December 4: ASWC #6 in (Canada) Lake Louise #2
  - Women's downhill winner: (Slovenia) Ilka Štuhec (2 times)
  - Women's super-G winner: (Switzerland) Lara Gut

December

- December 10 & 11: ASWC #7 in (France) Val-d'Isère #2
  - Men's giant slalom winner: (France) Alexis Pinturault
  - Men's slalom winner: (Norway) Henrik Kristoffersen
- December 10 & 11: ASWC #8 in (Italy) Sestriere
  - Women's giant slalom winner: (France) Tessa Worley
  - Women's slalom winner: (United States) Mikaela Shiffrin
- December 14–17: ASWC #9 in (Italy) Val Gardena
  - Men's super-G winner: (Norway) Kjetil Jansrud
  - Men's downhill winner: (Austria) Max Franz
- December 14–18: ASWC #10 in (France) Val-d'Isère #3
  - Women's alpine combined winner: (Slovenia) Ilka Štuhec
  - Women's downhill winner: (Slovenia) Ilka Štuhec
  - Women's super-G winner: (Switzerland) Lara Gut
- December 18 & 19: ASWC #11 in (Italy) Alta Badia
  - Men's giant slalom winner: (Austria) Marcel Hirscher
  - Men's Parallel giant slalom winner: (France) Cyprien Sarrazin
- December 20: ASWC #12 in (France) Courchevel
  - Event cancelled, due to strong winds.
- December 22: ASWC #13 in (Italy) Madonna di Campiglio
  - Men's slalom winner: (Norway) Henrik Kristoffersen
- December 26–29: ASWC #14 in (Italy) Santa Caterina
  - The Men's Downhill event here was cancelled.
  - Men's super-G winner: (Norway) Kjetil Jansrud
  - Men's alpine combined winner: (France) Alexis Pinturault
- December 27–29: ASWC #15 in (Austria) Semmering
  - Note: One Giant slalom event was rescheduled from the Courchevel venue to this one.
  - Women's giant slalom winner: (United States) Mikaela Shiffrin (2 times)
  - Women's slalom winner: (United States) Mikaela Shiffrin

January

- January 3 & 5: ASWC #15 in (Croatia) Zagreb
  - Slalom winners: (Italy) Manfred Mölgg (m) / (Slovakia) Veronika Velez-Zuzulová (f)
- January 7 & 8: ASWC #16 in (Switzerland) Adelboden
  - Men's giant slalom winner: (France) Alexis Pinturault
  - Men's slalom winner: (Norway) Henrik Kristoffersen
- January 7 & 8: WC #17 in (Slovenia) Maribor
  - Women's giant slalom winner: (France) Tessa Worley
  - Women's slalom winner: (United States) Mikaela Shiffrin
- January 10: ASWC #18 in (Austria) Flachau
  - Women's slalom winner: (Sweden) Frida Hansdotter
- January 10–15: ASWC #19 in (Switzerland) Wengen
  - Note: The men's downhill event here was cancelled.
  - Men's alpine combined winner: (Switzerland) Niels Hintermann
  - Men's slalom winner: (Norway) Henrik Kristoffersen
- January 12–15: ASWC #20 in (Austria) Altenmarkt im Pongau
  - Note: The women's alpine combined event here was cancelled.
  - Women's downhill winner: (Austria) Christine Scheyer
- January 17–22: ASWC #21 in (Austria) Kitzbühel
  - Men's super-G winner: (Austria) Matthias Mayer
  - Men's downhill winner: (Italy) Dominik Paris
  - Men's slalom winner: (Austria) Marcel Hirscher
- January 19–22: ASWC #22 in (Germany) Garmisch-Partenkirchen #1
  - Women's downhill winner: (United States) Lindsey Vonn
  - Women's super-G winner: (Switzerland) Lara Gut
- January 24: ASWC #23 in (Austria) Schladming
  - Men's slalom winner: (Norway) Henrik Kristoffersen
- January 24: ASWC #24 in (Italy) Kronplatz
  - Women's giant slalom winner: (Italy) Federica Brignone
- January 26–29: ASWC #25 in (Germany) Garmisch-Partenkirchen #2
  - Men's downhill winners: (United States) Travis Ganong (#1) / (Austria) Hannes Reichelt (#2)
  - Men's giant slalom winner: (Austria) Marcel Hirscher
- January 26–29: ASWC #26 in (Italy) Cortina d'Ampezzo
  - Women's downhill winner: (Switzerland) Lara Gut
  - Women's super-G winner: (Slovenia) Ilka Štuhec
- January 31: ASWC #27 in (Sweden) Stockholm
  - City Event winners: (Germany) Linus Straßer (m) / (United States) Mikaela Shiffrin (f)

February

- February 23–26: ASWC #28 in (Norway) Kvitfjell
  - Men's downhill winners: (Slovenia) Boštjan Kline (#1) / (Norway) Kjetil Jansrud (#2)
  - Men's super-G winner: (Italy) Peter Fill
- February 24–26: ASWC #29 in (Switzerland) Crans-Montana
  - Women's alpine combined winners: (Italy) Federica Brignone (#1) / (United States) Mikaela Shiffrin (#2)
  - Women's super-G winner: (Slovenia) Ilka Štuhec

March

- March 2–5: ASWC #30 in (South Korea) Jeongseon
  - Women's Downhill & Super G winner: (Italy) Sofia Goggia
- March 4 & 5: ASWC #31 in (Slovenia) Kranjska Gora
  - Men's giant slalom winner: (Austria) Marcel Hirscher
  - Men's slalom winner: (Austria) Michael Matt
- March 10 & 11: ASWC #32 in (United States) Squaw Valley
  - Women's giant slalom and Slalom winner: (United States) Mikaela Shiffrin
- March 13–19: ASWC #33 (final) in (United States) Aspen
  - Downhill winners: (Italy) Dominik Paris (m) / (Slovenia) Ilka Štuhec (f)
  - Super G winners: (Austria) Hannes Reichelt (m) / (Liechtenstein) Tina Weirather (f)
  - Giant slalom winners: (Austria) Marcel Hirscher (m) / (Italy) Federica Brignone (f)
  - Slalom winners: (Sweden) André Myhrer (m) / (Slovakia) Petra Vlhová (f)
  - Alpine Team Event winners: Sweden (Frida Hansdotter, Maria Pietilä Holmner, Emelie Wikstroem, Mattias Hargin, André Myhrer, & Matts Olsson)

=== 2016–17 Europa Cup ===
- November 29 & 30: ASEC #1 in (Finland) Levi
  - Men's slalom winners: (Norway) Leif Kristian Haugen (#1); (Austria) Marc Digruber (#2)
- December 3 & 4: ASEC #2 in (Sweden) Gällivare
  - Men's giant slalom winners: (France) Cyprien Sarrazin (m) / Second event is cancelled
- December 4–6: ASEC #3 in (Norway) Trysil
  - Women's giant slalom winner: (Norway) Kristin Anna Lysdahl
  - Women's slalom winners: (Norway) Maren Skjøld (#1); (Germany) Maren Wiesler (#2)
- December 8–10: ASEC #4 in (Norway) Kvitfjell
  - Women's giant slalom winner: (France) Clara Direz
  - Women's super-G winner: (Austria) Dajana Dengscherz
  - Women's Alpine combined winner: (Norway) Kristina Riis-Johannessen
- December 8–11: ASEC #5 in (Norway) Hafjell
  - Unfortunately the races in Hafjell are cancelled.
- December 14: ASEC #6 in (Italy) Obereggen
  - Men's slalom winner: (France) Loïc Meillard
- December 15: ASEC #7 in (Italy) Val di Fassa
  - Men's slalom winner: (Switzerland) Daniel Yule
- December 15 & 16: ASEC #8 in (Italy) Andalo
  - Women's giant slalom winner: (Switzerland) Simone Wild
  - Women's slalom winner: (United States) Resi Stiegler
- December 17: ASEC #8 in (Italy) Kronplatz
  - Parallel slalom winners: (Switzerland) Reto Schmidiger (m) / (Austria) Katharina Gallhuber (f)
  - Slalom winners (1 run): (Croatia) Matej Vidović (m) / (United States) Resi Stiegler (f)
- December 20 & 21: ASEC #9 in (Austria) Schladming
  - Men's super-G winners: (Norway) Bjørnar Neteland (#1) / (Austria) Christoph Krenn (#2)
- January 6 & 7, 2017: ASEC #10 in (Switzerland) Wengen
  - Men's super-G winners: (Italy) Mattia Casse (2 times)
- January 9–13: ASEC #11 in (Austria) Saalbach-Hinterglemm
  - Women's downhill winners: (Austria) Christina Ager (#1) / (#2)
  - Women's Super G here is cancelled
- January 9 & 10: ASEC #12 in (Switzerland) Davos #1
  - Men's giant slalom winners: (Norway) Marcus Monsen (#1) / (Finland) Samu Torsti (#2)
- January 11 & 12: ASEC #13 in (Austria) Zell am See
  - Men's slalom winners: (Croatia) Matej Vidović (#1) / (Austria) Thomas Hettegger (#2)
- January 14–16: ASEC #14 in (Austria) Kitzbühel
  - Men's downhill winner: (Switzerland) Gilles Roulin
- January 16 & 17: ASEC #15 in (Switzerland) Zinal
  - Women's giant slalom winners: (Norway) Kristina Riis-Johannessen (#1) / (Germany) Jessica Hilzinger (#2)
- January 19 & 20: ASEC #16 in (Switzerland) Melchsee-Frutt
  - Women's slalom winners: (Germany) Marina Wallner (#1) / (Germany) Jessica Hilzinger (#2)
- January 19 & 20: ASEC #17 in (France) Val-d'Isère
  - Men's giant slalom winners: (France) Cyprien Sarrazin (#1) / (Switzerland) Gino Caviezel (#2)
- January 23–27: ASEC #18 in (Switzerland) Davos #2
  - Women's downhill winners: (Norway) Kristina Riis-Johannessen (#1) / (Austria) Sabrina Maier (#2)
  - Women's Super-G winners: (Austria) Stephanie Brunner (#1) / (Austria) Nadine Fest (#2)
- January 23–27: ASEC #19 in (France) Méribel
  - Men's downhill winners: (Austria) Johannes Kröll (#1) / (Switzerland) Gilles Roulin (#2)
  - Men's Super-G winner: (Switzerland) Gilles Roulin
  - Men's alpine combined winner: (Norway) Marcus Monsen
- January 31 – February 3: ASEC #20 in (France) Châtel
  - Women's Super-G winners: (Austria) Nadine Fest (#1) / (Norway) Kristina Riis-Johannessen (#2)
  - Women's giant slalom winners: (Norway) Kristin Anna Lysdahl (#1) / (Slovenia) Tina Robnik (#2)
  - Women's alpine combined winner: (Austria) Nadine Fest
- January 31 – February 3: ASEC #21 in (Austria) Hinterstoder
  - Men's downhill winners: (Switzerland) Gilles Roulin (2 times)
  - Men's Super-G winner: (Switzerland) Gilles Roulin
  - Men's Alpine Combined: (Switzerland) Gilles Roulin
- February 8 & 9: ASEC #22 in (Slovakia) Jasná
  - Men's giant slalom winners: (Norway) Rasmus Windingstad (#1) / (Switzerland) Elia Zurbriggen (#2)
- February 9 & 10: ASEC #23 in (Germany) Bad Wiessee
  - Women's slalom winners: (Switzerland) Mélanie Meillard (2 times)
- February 11 & 12: ASEC #24 in (Poland) Zakopane
  - Men's slalom winners: (Switzerland) Reto Schmidiger (#1) / (Austria) Marc Digruber (#2)
- February 13 & 14: ASEC #25 in (Austria) Göstling-Hochkar
  - Women's giant slalom winner: (Slovenia) Tina Robnik
  - Women's slalom winner: (Sweden) Anna Swenn-Larsson
- February 17–20: ASEC #26 in (Switzerland) Crans-Montana
  - Women's downhill winners: (Italy) Laura Pirovano (#1) / (Austria) Sabrina Maier (#2)
  - Women's Alpine combined winner: (Austria) Rosina Schneeberger
- February 17 & 18: ASEC #27 in (Germany) Oberjoch
  - Men's giant slalom winners: (Switzerland) Elia Zurbriggen (#1) / (France) Cyprien Sarrazin (#2)
  - Men's slalom winner: (Austria) Marc Digruber
- February 20–25: ASEC #28 in (Italy) Sarntal
  - Super G winners: (Austria) Christian Walder (m) / (Austria) Nina Ortlieb (f)
  - Men's Alpine combined winner: (Switzerland) Sandro Simonet
  - Men's downhill winners: (Austria) Joachim Puchner (#1) / (Austria) Johannes Kröll (#2)
  - Women's downhill winner: (Sweden) Lisa Hörnblad
- March 17–19: ASEC #29 in (Italy) San Candido (final)
  - Giant slalom winners: (Switzerland) Elia Zurbriggen (m) / (Austria) Elisabeth Kappaurer (f)
  - Slalom winners: (Switzerland) Ramon Zenhäusern (m) / (Switzerland) Camille Rast (f)

=== 2016–17 North America Cup ===
- November 29 & 30, 2016: ASNAC #1 in (United States) Snow King Mountain/Jackson, Wyoming
  - Due to the lack of snow, the Snow King Race to the Cup has been canceled.
- December 5–9, 2016: ASNAC #2 in (Canada) Lake Louise
  - Downhill #1 winners: (United States) Nicholas Krause (m) / (Canada) Stefanie Fleckenstein (f)
  - Downhill #2 winners: (Canada) Tyler Werry (m) / (New Zealand) Georgia Willinger (f)
- December 11–18, 2016: ASNAC #3 in (Canada) Panorama Mountain Village
  - Super G #1 winners: (Andorra) Joan Verdu Sanchez (m) / (United States) Maureen Lebel (f)
  - Super G #2 winners: (Andorra) Joan Verdu Sanchez (m) / (United States) Alice Merryweather (f)
  - Alpine combined winners: (United States) Kieffer Christianson (m) / (United States) Patricia Mangan (f)
  - Giant slalom #1 winners: (Canada) Phil Brown (m) / (Canada) Erin Mielzynski (f)
  - Giant slalom #2 winners: (Canada) Phil Brown (m) / (Canada) Amelia Smart (f)
  - Slalom #1 winners: (United States) Hig Roberts (m) / (Canada) Erin Mielzynski (f)
  - Slalom #2 winners: (Germany) David Ketterer (m) / (Canada) Erin Mielzynski (f)
- January 2–5: ASNAC #4 in (United States) Burke Mountain Ski Area
  - Giant slalom winners: (United States) Paula Moltzan (#1) / (Canada) Ali Nullmeyer (#2)
  - Slalom winners: (United States) Paula Moltzan (#1) / (Canada) Ali Nullmeyer (#2)
- January 2–5: ASNAC #5 in (United States) Stowe Mountain Resort
  - Giant slalom winners: (United States) Nicholas Krause (#1) / (United States) Hig Roberts (#2)
  - Slalom winners: (Germany) David Ketterer (#1) / (United States) Jett Seymour (#2)
- February 1–4: ASNAC #6 in (United States) Vail Ski Resort
  - Men's slalom winners: (Germany) David Ketterer (#1) / (United States) Mark Engel (#2)
  - Women's slalom winners: (Canada) Ali Nullmeyer (2 times)
- February 1–11: ASNAC #7 in (United States) Copper Mountain
  - Men's giant slalom winners: (Canada) Erik Read (#1) / (Canada) Trevor Philp (#2)
  - Women's giant slalom winners: (United States) Megan McJames (#1) / (Canada) Ali Nullmeyer (#2)
  - Men's downhill winners: (Canada) Broderick Thompson (#1) / (Canada) Tyler Werry (#2)
  - Women's downhill winners: (United States) Alice McKennis (2 times)
  - Super G #1 winners: (United States) Nicholas Krause (m) / (United States) Patricia Mangan (f)
  - Super G #2 winners: (United States) Nicholas Krause (m) / (United States) Patricia Mangan (f)
  - Alpine combined winners: (Canada) Tyler Werry (m) / (United States) Nina O'Brien (f)
- March 17–20: ASNAC #8 in (Canada) Mont Ste. Marie
  - Men's giant slalom winners: (United States) Tim Jitloff (#1) / (Canada) Trevor Philp (#2)
  - Men's slalom winner: (Germany) David Ketterer (2 times)
- March 17 & 18: ASNAC #9 in (Canada) Val Saint-Côme Ski Resort
  - Women's slalom winners: (France) Laurie Mougel (#1) / (Canada) Ali Nullmeyer (#2)
- March 19 & 20: ASNAC #10 in (Canada) Garceau
  - Women's giant slalom winners: (United States) Nina O'Brien (#1) / (Canada) Mikaela Tommy (#2)
- March 22 & 23: ASNAC #11 (final) in (United States) Sugarloaf
  - Alpine combined winners: (Canada) Sam Mulligan (m) / (Canada) Mikaela Tommy (f)
  - Super G #1 winners: (United States) Erik Arvidsson (m) / (United States) Stacey Cook (f)
  - Super G #2 winners: (United States) Kipling Weisel (m) / (United States) Megan McJames (f)

=== 2016–17 Far East Cup ===
- December 11–14: FEC #1 in (China) Wanlong Ski Resort/Zhangjiakou
  - Men's slalom winners: (Russia) Simon Efimov (#1) / (Japan) Ryunosuke Ohkoshi (#2)
  - Women's slalom winners: (Russia) Rinata Abdulkaiumova (#1) / (Japan) Sakurako Mukogawa (#2)
  - Men's giant slalom winners: (Switzerland) Ian Gut (2 times)
  - Women's giant Slalom winners: (Japan) Mio Arai (2 times)
- January 16–19: FEC #2 in (South Korea) Yongpyong Resort
  - Men's slalom winners: (Japan) Ryunosuke Ohkoshi (#1) / (Slovenia) Žan Kranjec (#2)
  - Women's slalom winners: (Japan) Emi Hasegawa (#1) / (Serbia) Nevena Ignjatović (#2)
  - Men's giant slalom winners: (Slovenia) Žan Kranjec (#1) / (Russia) Pavel Trikhichev (#2)
  - Women's giant slalom winners: (United Kingdom) Alexandra Tilley (#1) / (Japan) Asa Andō (#2)
- January 22–24: FEC #3 in (South Korea) Alpensia Resort
  - Slalom #1 winners: (Russia) Pavel Trikhichev (m) / (Serbia) Nevena Ignjatović (f)
  - Slalom #2 winners: (Russia) Pavel Trikhichev (m) / (Russia) Ekaterina Tkachenko (f)
  - Slalom #3 winners: (Slovenia) Žan Grošelj (m) / (Russia) Ekaterina Tkachenko (f)
- March 3–5: FEC #4 in (Japan) Sapporo Teine
  - Note: One Giant slalom event here was cancelled.
  - Giant slalom winners: (Switzerland) Marco Reymond (m) / (Japan) Asa Andō (f)
  - Slalom winners: (Germany) Sebastian Holzmann (m) / (Sweden) Ylva Stålnacke (f)
- March 8–10: FEC #5 in (Japan) Engaru, Hokkaido
  - Giant slalom winners: (Germany) Alexander Schmid (m) / (Japan) Asa Andō (f)
  - Slalom #1 winners: (Germany) Sebastian Holzmann (m) / (Sweden) Ylva Stålnacke (f)
  - Slalom #2 winners: (Germany) Sebastian Holzmann (m) / (Sweden) Ylva Stålnacke (f)
- March 17–22: FEC #6 in (Russia) Yuzhno-Sakhalinsk
  - Super G #1 winners: (Italy) Riccardo Tonetti (m) / (Russia) Aleksandra Prokopyeva (f)
  - Super G #2 winners: (Slovenia) Štefan Hadalin (m) / (Russia) Aleksandra Prokopyeva (f)
  - Giant slalom #1 winners: (Russia) Pavel Trikhichev (m) / (Japan) Emi Hasegawa (f)
  - Giant slalom #2 winners: (Italy) Roberto Nani (m) / (Japan) Emi Hasegawa (f)
  - Slalom #1 winners: (South Korea) Jung Dong-hyun (m) / (Slovenia) Maruša Ferk (f)
  - Slalom #2 winners: (Russia) Pavel Trikhichev (m) / (Japan) Emi Hasegawa (f)
- March 30 & 31: FEC #7 (final) in (Japan) Ontake
  - Alpine combined winners: (Japan) Yumenosuke Kakizaki (m) / (Japan) Sakurako Mukogawa (f)
  - Super G #1 winners: (Japan) Yumenosuke Kakizaki (m) / (Japan) Sakurako Mukogawa (f)
  - Super G #2 winners: (Japan) Dai Shimizu (m) / (Japan) Sakurako Mukogawa (f)

=== 2016 FIS Alpine South American Cup ===
- August 4–5: SAC #1 in (Argentina) Chapelco Ski Resort
  - This event was cancelled due warm temperatures.
- August 8–11: SAC #2 in (Argentina) Cerro Catedral
  - Giant slalom winners: (Italy) Pietro Franceschetti (m) / (Argentina) María Belén Simari Birkner (f)
  - Events in slalom was cancelled.
- August 13–15: SAC #3 in (Chile) Antillanca ski resort
  - Slalom winners: (Argentina) Sebastiano Gastaldi (m) / (Czech Republic) Martina Dubovská (f)
- August 24–26: SAC #4 in (Chile) Valle Nevado
  - Super G winners: (Slovenia) Klemen Kosi (m) / (Chile) Noelle Barahona (f)
- August 27: SAC #5 in (Chile) El Colorado #1
  - Giant slalom winners: (Slovenia) Štefan Hadalin (m) / (France) Jade Grillet-Aubert (f)
- August 28: SAC #6 in (Chile) La Parva #1
  - Slalom winners: (Argentina) Salomé Báncora (m) / (Argentina) Francesca Baruzzi Farriol (f)
- August 31 – September 2: SAC #7 in (Argentina) Las Leñas
  - Cancelled
- September 5–9: SAC #8 in (Chile) La Parva #2
  - Downhill #1 winners: (France) Brice Roger (m) / (Chile) Noelle Barahona (f)
  - Downhill #2 winners: (France) Brice Roger (m) / (Czech Republic) Ester Ledecká (f)
  - Super G winners: (France) Valentin Giraud Moine (m) / (Czech Republic) Ester Ledecká (f)
- September 12–16: SAC #9 in (Chile) El Colorado #2
  - Alpine combined #1 winners: (Slovenia) Martin Cater (m) / (Czech Republic) Ester Ledecká (f)
  - Alpine combined #2 winners: (Germany) Thomas Dreßen (m) / (Czech Republic) Ester Ledecká (f)
  - Super G #1 winners: (Germany) Josef Ferstl (m) / (Czech Republic) Ester Ledecká (f)
  - Super G #2 winners: (Germany) Josef Ferstl (m) / (Czech Republic) Ester Ledecká (f)
  - Downhill #1 winners: (Germany) Josef Ferstl (m) / (Czech Republic) Ester Ledecká (f)
  - Downhill #1 winners: (Italy) Mattia Casse (m) / (Czech Republic) Ester Ledecká (f)
- September 26–29: SAC #10 (final) in (Argentina) Cerro Castor
  - Giant slalom winners: (France) Cyprien Sarrazin (m) / (France) Adeline Baud (f)
  - Slalom winners: (Argentina) Sebastiano Gastaldi (m) / (France) Adeline Baud (f)

=== 2016 FIS Alpine Australia/New Zealand Cup ===
- August 22–26: ANC #1 in (Australia) Mount Hotham
  - Giant slalom #1 winners: (New Zealand) Willis Feasey (m) / (Germany) Julia Mutschlechner (f)
  - Giant slalom #2 winners: (Slovakia) Andreas Žampa (m) / (Germany) Julia Mutschlechner (f)
  - Slalom #1 winners: (United States) Robby Kelley (m) / (Norway) Rikke Gasmann-Brott (f)
  - Slalom #2 winners: (United States) Robby Kelley (m) / (Norway) Rikke Gasmann-Brott (f)
- August 29 – September 1: ANC #2 in (New Zealand) Coronet Peak
  - Giant slalom #1 winners: (United States) Tim Jitloff (m) / (Norway) Ragnhild Mowinckel (f)
  - Giant slalom #2 winners: (Austria) Manuel Feller (m) / (Austria) Bernadette Schild (f)
  - Slalom #1 winners: (Austria) Manuel Feller (m) / (Austria) Ricarda Haaser (f)
  - Slalom #2 winners: (Switzerland) Ramon Zenhäusern (m) / (Austria) Katharina Huber (f)
- September 6 & 7: ANC #3 (final) in (New Zealand) Mount Hutt
  - Super G #1 winners: (New Zealand) Willis Feasey (m) / (New Zealand) Piera Hudson (f)
  - Super G #2 winners: (Switzerland) Marc Gehrig (m) / (New Zealand) Piera Hudson (f)
  - Alpine combined and Super G #3 here was cancelled

== Biathlon ==
- November 25, 2016 – March 19, 2017: 2016–17 IBU Calendar of Events

=== International biathlon championships ===
- January 22–29: 2017 IBU Open European Championships in (Poland) Duszniki-Zdrój
  - Individual winners: (Russia) Alexandr Loginov (m) / (Russia) Irina Starykh (f)
  - Pursuit winners: (Russia) Alexandr Loginov (m) / (Russia) Irina Starykh (f)
  - Sprint winners: (Bulgaria) Vladimir Iliev (m) / (Ukraine) Juliya Dzhyma (f)
  - Single Mixed Relay winners: Russia (Daria Virolaynen & Evgeniy Garanichev)
  - Mixed Relay winners: Russia (Irina Starykh, Svetlana Sleptsova, Alexey Volkov & Alexandr Loginov)
- February 1–5: 2017 IBU Junior Open European Championships in (Czech Republic) Nové Město na Moravě
  - Junior Individual winners: (Russia) Igor Malinovskii (m) / (Germany) Anna Weidel (f)
  - Junior Pursuit winners: (Czech Republic) Milan Zemlicka (m) / (Czech Republic) Marketa Davidova (f)
  - Junior Sprint winners: (Russia) Nikita Porshnev (m) / (Czech Republic) Marketa Davidova (f)
- February 6–19: Biathlon World Championships 2017 in (Austria) Hochfilzen
  - Individual winners: (United States) Lowell Bailey (m) / (Germany) Laura Dahlmeier (f)
  - Pursuit winners: (France) Martin Fourcade (m) / (Germany) Laura Dahlmeier (f)
  - Sprint winners: (Germany) Benedikt Doll (m) / (Czech Republic) Gabriela Koukalová (f)
  - Men's Relay winners: Russia (Alexey Volkov, Maxim Tsvetkov, Anton Babikov, & Anton Shipulin)
  - Women's Relay winners: Germany (Vanessa Hinz, Maren Hammerschmidt, Franziska Hildebrand, & Laura Dahlmeier)
  - Mixed Relay winners: Germany (Vanessa Hinz, Laura Dahlmeier, Arnd Peiffer & Simon Schempp)
  - Mass Start winners: (Germany) Simon Schempp (m) / (Germany) Laura Dahlmeier (f)
- February 22–28: 2017 IBU Youth/Junior World Championships in (Slovakia) Brezno-Osrblie
  - Note: This event was supposed to be hosted in Ostrov, but the IBU took it back.
  - Russia won both the gold and overall medal tallies.
- August 24–27: 2017 IBU Summer Biathlon World Championships in Chaykovsky, Perm Krai
  - Russia won both the gold and overall medal tallies.

=== 2016–17 Biathlon World Cup ===
- November 25 – December 4, 2016: BWC #1 in (Sweden) Östersund
  - Individual winners: (France) Martin Fourcade (m) / (Germany) Laura Dahlmeier (f)
  - Pursuit winners: (Russia) Anton Babikov (m) / (Czech Republic) Gabriela Koukalová (f)
  - Sprint winners: (France) Martin Fourcade (m) / (France) Marie Dorin Habert (f)
  - Single Mixed Relay winners: France (Martin Fourcade, Marie Dorin Habert)
  - Mixed 2x6 + 2x7.5 km Relay winners: Norway (Johannes Thingnes Bø, Ole Einar Bjørndalen, Fanny Horn Birkeland, Marte Olsbu)
- December 5–11, 2016: BWC #2 in (Slovenia) Pokljuka
  - Pursuit winners: (France) Martin Fourcade (m) / (Germany) Laura Dahlmeier (f)
  - Sprint winners: (France) Martin Fourcade (m) / (Germany) Laura Dahlmeier (f)
  - Men's Relay winners: France (Jean-Guillaume Béatrix, Quentin Fillon Maillet, Simon Desthieux, Martin Fourcade)
  - Women's Relay winners: Germany (Vanessa Hinz, Franziska Hildebrand, Maren Hammerschmidt, Laura Dahlmeier)
- December 12–18, 2016: BWC #3 in (Czech Republic) Nové Město na Moravě
  - Pursuit winners: (France) Martin Fourcade (m) / (France) Anaïs Chevalier (f)
  - Sprint winners: (France) Martin Fourcade (m) / (Russia) Tatiana Akimova (f)
  - Mass start winners: (France) Martin Fourcade (m) / (Czech Republic) Gabriela Koukalová (f)
- January 2–8: BWC #4 in Oberhof, Germany
  - Pursuit winners: (France) Martin Fourcade (m) / (France) Marie Dorin Habert (f)
  - Sprint winners: (Austria) Julian Eberhard (m) / (Czech Republic) Gabriela Koukalová (f)
  - Mass start winners: (Germany) Simon Schempp (m) / (Czech Republic) Gabriela Koukalová (f)
- January 10–15: BWC #5 in Ruhpolding
  - Pursuit winners: (France) Martin Fourcade (m) / (Finland) Kaisa Mäkäräinen (f)
  - Sprint winners: (France) Martin Fourcade (m) / (Finland) Kaisa Mäkäräinen (f)
  - Men's Relay winners: Norway (Ole Einar Bjørndalen, Vetle Sjåstad Christiansen, Henrik L'Abée-Lund, Emil Hegle Svendsen)
  - Women's Relay winners: Germany (Vanessa Hinz, Maren Hammerschmidt, Franziska Preuß, Laura Dahlmeier)
- January 16–22: BWC #6 in (Italy) Antholz-Anterselva
  - Individual winners: (Russia) Anton Shipulin (m) / (Germany) Laura Dahlmeier (f)
  - Mass start winners: (Norway) Johannes Thingnes Bø (m) / (Germany) Nadine Horchler (f)
  - Men's Relay winners: Germany (Erik Lesser, Benedikt Doll, Arnd Peiffer, Simon Schempp)
  - Women's Relay winners: Germany (Vanessa Hinz, Maren Hammerschmidt, Franziska Hildebrand, Laura Dahlmeier)
- February 27 – March 5: BWC #7 in (South Korea) Pyeongchang
  - Pursuit winners: (France) Martin Fourcade (m) / (Germany) Laura Dahlmeier (f)
  - Sprint winners: (Austria) Julian Eberhard (m) / (Germany) Laura Dahlmeier (f)
  - Men's Relay winners: France (Jean-Guillaume Béatrix, Simon Fourcade, Simon Desthieux, Martin Fourcade)
  - Women's Relay winners: Germany (Nadine Horchler, Maren Hammerschmidt, Denise Herrmann, Franziska Hildebrand)
- March 6–12: BWC #8 in (Finland) Kontiolahti
  - Note: This event was supposed to be hosted in Tyumen, but the IBU took it back.
  - Pursuit winners: (Germany) Arnd Peiffer (m) / (Germany) Laura Dahlmeier (f)
  - Sprint winners: (France) Martin Fourcade (m) / (Norway) Tiril Eckhoff (f)
  - Single Mixed Relay winners: Austria (Lisa Hauser & Simon Eder)
  - Mixed Relay winners: France (Marie Dorin Habert, Anaïs Bescond, Simon Desthieux, & Quentin Fillon Maillet)
- March 13–19: BWC #9 (final) in (Norway) Oslo-Holmenkollen
  - Pursuit winners: (Russia) Anton Shipulin (m) / (Finland) Mari Laukkanen (f)
  - Sprint winners: (Norway) Johannes Thingnes Bø (m) / (Finland) Mari Laukkanen (f)
  - Mass Start winners: (France) Martin Fourcade (m) / (Norway) Tiril Eckhoff (f)

=== 2016–17 IBU Cup ===
- November 23–27, 2016: IBU Cup #1 in (Norway) Beitostølen
  - Note: Both relay events here are cancelled.
  - Men's 10 km Sprint winners: (Norway) Vetle Sjåstad Christiansen (#1) / (Russia) Matvey Eliseev (#2)
  - Women's 7.5 km Sprint winners: (Germany) Denise Herrmann (#1) / (Czech Republic) Markéta Davidová (#2)
- December 6–11, 2016: IBU Cup #2 in (Italy) Ridnaun-Val Ridanna
  - Sprint winners: (Norway) Fredrik Gjesbakk (m) / (Ukraine) Anastasiya Merkushyna (f)
  - Pursuit winners: (France) Aristide Begue (m) / (Russia) Uliana Kaisheva (f)
  - Single Mixed Relay winners: Ukraine (Anastasiya Merkushyna, Artem Tyshchenko)
  - Mixed 2x6 + 2x7.5 km Relay winners: Russia (Victoria Slivko, Uliana Kaisheva, Semen Suchilov, Alexey Slepov)
- December 14–17, 2016: IBU Cup #3 in (Austria) Obertilliach
  - Individual winners: (France) Antonin Guigonnat (m) / (Germany) Karolin Horchler (f)
  - Sprint winners: (Norway) Henrik L'Abée-Lund (m) / (Russia) Daria Virolaynen (f)
- January 3–8: IBU Cup #4 in (Italy) Martell-Val Martello
  - Pursuit winners: (Russia) Alexandr Loginov (m) / (Russia) Daria Virolaynen (f)
  - Sprint winners #1: (Norway) Andreas Dahlø Waernes (m) / (Austria) Fabienne Hartweger (f)
  - Sprint winners #2: (Russia) Alexandr Loginov (m) / (France) Julia Simon (f)
- January 11–14: IBU Cup #5 in (Germany) Arber
  - Note: Both relay events here are cancelled.
  - Individual winners: (Russia) Alexandr Loginov (m) / (Russia) Irina Starykh (f)
- February 1–4: IBU Cup #6 in (Slovakia) Brezno-Osrblie
  - Pursuit winners: (Norway) Kristoffer Skjelvik (m) / (Russia) Daria Virolaynen (f)
  - Sprint winners: (Russia) Alexey Volkov (m) / (Germany) Denise Herrmann (f)
- February 28 – March 5: IBU Cup #7 in (Finland) Kontiolahti
  - Individual winners: (Czech Republic) Ondřej Moravec (m) / (Russia) Ekaterina Shumilova (f)
  - Pursuit winners: (Russia) Alexandr Loginov (m) / (Germany) Anna Weidel (f)
  - Sprint winners: (Russia) Alexander Povarnitsyn (m) / (Russia) Daria Virolaynen (f)
- March 7–12: IBU Cup #8 (final) in (Estonia) Otepää
  - Men's 10 km Sprint winner: (Russia) Alexandr Loginov (2 times)
  - Women's 7.5 km Sprint winners: (Russia) Anastasia Zagoruiko (#1) / (France) Enora Latuillière (#2)
  - Single Mixed Relay #1 winners: Norway (Thekla Brun-Lie & Martin Femsteinevik)
  - Mixed Relay #1 winners: Germany (Karolin Horchler, Marion Deigentesch, Matthias Dorfer, David Zobel)
  - Single Mixed Relay #2 winners: Russia (Anna Nikulina & Yury Shopin)
  - Mixed Relay #2 winners: Norway (Sigrid Bilstad Neraasen, Rikke Andersen, Sindre Pettersen, & Henrik L'Abée-Lund)

=== 2016–17 IBU Junior Cup ===
- December 9–11, 2016: IBU JC #1 in (Switzerland) Lenzerheide
  - Junior individual winners: (Ukraine) Anton Dudchenko (m) / (France) Julia Simon (f)
  - Junior sprint winners: (Ukraine) Vitaliy Trush (m) / (France) Caroline Colombo (f)
- December 14–17, 2016: IBU JC #2 in (Austria) Hochfilzen
  - Junior sprint winners: (Germany) Erik Weick (m) / (Russia) Valeriia Vasnetcova (f)
  - Junior pursuit winners: (Ukraine) Vitaliy Trush (m) / (Germany) Anna Weidel (f)
  - Junior relay winners: Russia (Aleksandr Nasekin, Igor Malinovskii, & Nikita Porshnev) (m) / France (Camille Bened, Myrtille Begue, & Lena Arnaud) (f)
- January 26–29: IBU JC #3 (final) in (Slovenia) Pokljuka
  - Junior men's sprint winners: (Russia) Kirill Streltsov (#1) / (Russia) Nikita Porshnev (#2)
  - Junior women's sprint winners: (Russia) Ekaterina Moshkova (#1) / (Russia) Valeriia Vasnetcova (#2)
  - Junior single mixed relay winners: Russia (Liudmila Ulybina & Semen Bey)
  - Junior mixed relay winners: Russia (Ekaterina Sannikova, Valeriia Vasnetcova, Nikita Porshnev, & Igor Malinovskii)

== Cross-country skiing ==
=== World Championships (XC) ===
- January 30 – February 5: Part of the 2017 Nordic Junior World Ski Championships in (United States) Park City
  - Russia won both the gold and overall medal tallies.
- February 22 – March 5: Part of the FIS Nordic World Ski Championships 2017 in (Finland) Lahti
  - Classical winners: (Finland) Iivo Niskanen (m) / (Norway) Marit Bjørgen (f)
  - Skiathlon winners: (Russia) Sergey Ustiugov (m) / (Norway) Marit Bjørgen (f)
  - Sprint winners: (Italy) Federico Pellegrino (m) / (Norway) Maiken Caspersen Falla (f)
  - Team Sprint winners: Russia (Nikita Kryukov & Sergey Ustiugov) (m) / Norway (Heidi Weng & Maiken Caspersen Falla) (f)
  - Men's 4 × 10 km relay winners: Norway (Didrik Tønseth, Niklas Dyrhaug, Martin Johnsrud Sundby, & Finn Hågen Krogh)
  - Women's 4 × 5 km relay winners: Norway (Maiken Caspersen Falla, Heidi Weng, Astrid Uhrenholdt Jacobsen, & Marit Bjørgen)
  - Mass Start winners: (Canada) Alex Harvey (m) / (Norway) Marit Bjørgen (f)

=== 2016–17 Tour de Ski ===
- December 31, 2016 & January 1, 2017: TdS #1 in (Switzerland) Val Müstair
  - Sprint Freestyle winners: (Russia) Sergey Ustiugov (m) / (Sweden) Stina Nilsson (f)
  - Classical Mass Start winners: (Russia) Sergey Ustiugov (m) / (Norway) Ingvild Flugstad Østberg (f)
- January 3 & 4: TdS #2 in (Germany) Oberstdorf
  - Skiathlon winners: (Russia) Sergey Ustiugov (m) / (Sweden) Stina Nilsson (f)
  - Freestyle Pursuit winners: (Russia) Sergey Ustiugov (m) / (Sweden) Stina Nilsson (f)
- January 6: TdS #3 in (Italy) Toblach #1
  - Freestyle winners: (Russia) Sergey Ustiugov (m) / (United States) Jessie Diggins (f)
- January 7 & 8: TdS #4 (final) in (Italy) Fiemme Valley
  - Classical Mass Start winners: (Norway) Martin Johnsrud Sundby (m) / (Sweden) Stina Nilsson (f)
  - Freestyle Pursuit winners: (Russia) Sergey Ustiugov (m) / (Norway) Heidi Weng (f)

=== 2016–17 FIS Cross-Country World Cup ===
- November 26, 2016 – March 19, 2017: 2016–17 FIS Cross-Country World Cup
  - November 26 & 27, 2016: XCWC #1 in (Finland) Ruka
    - Sprint Classical winners: (Norway) Pål Golberg (m) / (Sweden) Stina Nilsson (f)
    - Classical winners: (Finland) Iivo Niskanen (m) / (Norway) Marit Bjørgen (f)
  - December 2–4, 2016: XCWC #2 in (Norway) Lillehammer
    - Sprint Classical winners: (Sweden) Calle Halfvarsson (m) / (Norway) Heidi Weng (f)
    - Freestyle winners: (Sweden) Calle Halfvarsson (m) / (United States) Jessie Diggins (f)
    - Classical Pursuit winners: (Norway) Martin Johnsrud Sundby (m) / (Norway) Heidi Weng (f)
  - December 10 & 11, 2016: XCWC #3 in (Switzerland) Davos
    - Freestyle Mass Start winners: (Norway) Martin Johnsrud Sundby (m) / (Norway) Ingvild Flugstad Østberg (f)
    - Sprint Freestyle winners: (Russia) Sergey Ustiugov (m) / (Norway) Maiken Caspersen Falla (f)
  - December 17 & 18, 2016: XCWC #4 in (France) La Clusaz
    - Freestyle Mass Start winners: (Norway) Finn Hågen Krogh (m) / (Norway) Heidi Weng (f)
    - Men's Team Relay winners: Norway I (Didrik Tønseth, Martin Johnsrud Sundby, Anders Gløersen, Finn Hågen Krogh)
    - Women's Team Relay winners: Norway (Ingvild Flugstad Østberg, Marit Bjørgen, Ragnhild Haga, Heidi Weng)
  - January 14 & 15: XCWC #5 in (Italy) Toblach #2
    - Sprint Freestyle winners: (Norway) Sindre Bjørnestad Skar (m) / (Russia) Natalia Matveeva (f)
    - Men's Team Sprint Freestyle winners: Canada (Len Väljas & Alex Harvey)
    - Women's Team Sprint Freestyle winners: Russia (Yulia Belorukova & Natalia Matveeva)
  - January 21 & 22: XCWC #6 in (Sweden) Ulricehamn
    - Freestyle winners: (Canada) Alex Harvey (m) / (Norway) Marit Bjørgen (f)
    - Men's Team Relay winners: Norway (Simen Hegstad Krueger, Martin Johnsrud Sundby, Anders Gløersen, Finn Hågen Krogh)
    - Women's Team Relay winners: Norway (Ingvild Flugstad Østberg, Heidi Weng, Astrid Uhrenholdt Jacobsen, Marit Bjørgen)
  - January 28 & 29: XCWC #7 in (Sweden) Falun
    - Sprint Freestyle winners: (Italy) Federico Pellegrino (m) / (Sweden) Stina Nilsson (f)
    - Classical Mass Start winners: (Norway) Emil Iversen (m) / (Norway) Marit Bjørgen (f)
  - February 3–5: XCWC #8 in (South Korea) Pyeongchang
    - Sprint Classical winners: (Russia) Gleb Retivykh (m) / (Slovenia) Anamarija Lampic (f)
    - Skiathlon winners: (Russia) Petr Sedov (m) / (Poland) Justyna Kowalczyk (f)
    - Men's Team Sprint Freestyle winners: Russia (Andrey Parfenov & Gleb Retivykh)
    - Women's Team Sprint Freestyle winners: Sweden (Elin Mohlin & Maria Nordstroem)
  - February 18 & 19: XCWC #9 in (Estonia) Otepää
    - Sprint Freestyle winners: (Norway) Johannes Høsflot Klæbo (m) / (Sweden) Stina Nilsson (f)
    - Classical winners: (Norway) Martin Johnsrud Sundby (m) / (Norway) Marit Bjørgen (f)
  - March 8: XCWC #10 in (Norway) Drammen
    - Sprint Classical winners: (Norway) Eirik Brandsdal (m) / (Sweden) Stina Nilsson (f)
  - March 11 & 12: XCWC #11 in (Norway) Oslo
    - Classical Mass Start winners: (Norway) Martin Johnsrud Sundby (m) / (Norway) Marit Bjørgen (f)
  - March 17–19: XCWC #12 (final) in (Canada) Quebec City
    - Note: Due to the release of the McLaren Report, Russia has voluntarily handed back the event to the FIS from Tyumen.
    - Sprint Freestyle winners: (Canada) Alex Harvey (m) / (Sweden) Stina Nilsson (f)
    - Freestyle Pursuit & Classical Mass Start winners: (Norway) Johannes Høsflot Klæbo (m; 2 times) / (Norway) Marit Bjørgen (f; 2 times)

=== 2016–17 FIS OPA Continental Cup ===
- December 10 & 11: OPA #1 in (Italy) Valdidentro
  - Men's 15 km Classic winners: (France) Alexis Jeannerod (#1) / (Andorra) Irineu Esteve Altimiras (#2)
  - Women's 10 km Classic winners: (Poland) Justyna Kowalczyk (#1) / (Italy) Caterina Ganz (#2)
- December 16–18: OPA #2 in (Switzerland) Goms
  - Men's 1.4 km Sprint Classic winner: (Russia) Anton Gafarov
  - Women's 1.2 km Sprint Classic winner: (Russia) Natalya Matveyeva
  - Men's 15 km Classic winner: (Italy) Giandomenico Salvadori
  - Women's 10 km Classic winner: (Italy) Caterina Ganz
  - Men's 15 km Freestyle winner: (Italy) Maicol Rastelli
  - Women's 10 km Freestyle winner: (Germany) Sofie Krehl
- January 6–8: OPA #3 in (Slovenia) Planica
  - Men's 1.2 km Sprint Freestyle winner: (United States) Simi Hamilton
  - Women's 1.2 km Sprint Freestyle winner: (United States) Sophie Caldwell
  - Men's 10 km Freestyle winner: (France) Jean Tiberghien
  - Women's 10 km Freestyle winner: (Italy) Sara Pellegrini
  - Men's 15 km Classic winner: (Italy) Dietmar Nöckler
  - Women's 10 km Classic winner: (Italy) Francesca Baudin
- February 17–19: OPA #4 in (Germany) Zwiesel
  - 1.6 Sprint Classic winners: (Italy) Sergio Rigoni (m) / (Italy) Caterina Ganz (f)
  - Men's 15 km Freestyle winner: (France) Paul Goalabre
  - Women's 10 km Freestyle winner: (Germany) Monique Siegel
  - Men's 15 km Classic Pursuit winner: (Italy) Giandomenico Salvadori
  - Women's 10 km Classic Pursuit winner: (Italy) Caterina Ganz
- March 4 & 5: OPA #5 in (Austria) St. Ulrich
  - Men's 15 km Freestyle winner: (France) Adrien Backscheider
  - Women's 10 km Freestyle winner: (Austria) Lisa Unterweger
  - Men's 30 km Classic winner: (Germany) Thomas Wick
  - Women's 15 km Classic winner: (Germany) Theresa Eichhorn
- March 17–19: OPA #6 in (Austria) Seefeld in Tirol (final)
  - Men's 3.3 km Freestyle winner: (France) Jean Tiberghien
  - Women's 2.5 km Freestyle winner: (United States) Caitlin Compton Gregg
  - Men's 15 km Classic winner: (Italy) Maicol Rastelli
  - Women's 10 km Classic winner: (Germany) Theresa Eichhorn
  - Men's 15 km Freestyle Pursuit winner: (Italy) Maicol Rastelli
  - Women's 10 km Freestyle Pursuit winner: (Germany) Theresa Eichhorn

=== 2016 Australia/New Zealand Cup ===
- August 6 & 7: ANC #1 in (Australia) Perisher Ski Resort (part of Australian Championships)
  - Speed 1 km winners: (Australia) Mark Pollock (m) / (Australia) Katerina Paul (f)
  - Men's 10 km Free winner: (Australia) Mark Pollock
  - Women's 5 km Free winner: (Australia) Lillian Boland
- August 20 & 21: ANC #2 in (Australia) Falls Creek, Victoria (part of Australian Championships)
  - Speed 1 km Free winners: (Australia) Phillip Bellingham (m) / (United States) Kelsey Phinney
  - Men's 15 km winner: (Australia) Phillip Bellingham
  - Women's 10 km winner: (Japan) Chisa Ōbayashi
- September 9–11: ANC #3 (final) in (New Zealand) Snow Farm
  - Sprint Cross winners: (United States) Andrew Newell (m) / (United States) Ida Sargent (f)
  - Men's 15 km Cross winner: (United States) Andrew Newell
  - Women's 10 km Cross winner: (United States) Jessie Diggins
  - Men's 10 km Free winner: (United States) Simi Hamilton
  - Women's 5 km winner: (United States) Liz Stephen

=== 2016–17 North American Cup ===
- December 10 & 11, 2016: NAC #1 in (Canada) Sovereign Lake Nordic Centre/Vernon, British Columbia
  - Men's Sprint Classical winner: (United States) Reese Hanneman
  - Women's Sprint Classical winner: (United States) Julia Kern
  - Men's 15 km Freestyle winner: (United States) Scott Patterson
  - Women's 10 km Freestyle winner: (United States) Chelsea Holmes
- December 16–18, 2016: NAC #2 in (Canada) Rossland, British Columbia
  - Men's 15 km Freestyle winner: (Canada) Evan Palmer-Charrette
  - Women's 10 km Freestyle winner: (United States) Chelsea Holmes
  - Sprint Freestyle winners: (United States) Andrew Newell (m) / (United States) Erika Flowers (f)
  - Men's 15 km Classical Pursuit winner: (Canada) Evan Palmer-Charrette
  - Women's 10 km Classical Pursuit winner: (United States) Chelsea Holmes
- January 20 & 21: NAC #3 in (Canada) Whistler Olympic Park
  - Sprint Freestyle winners: (Canada) Jesse Cockney (m) / (Canada) Dahria Beatty (f)
  - Men's 15 km Freestyle winner: (Canada) Andy Shields
  - Women's 10 km Freestyle winner: (Canada) Emily Nishikawa
- February 3–5: NAC #4 (final) in (Canada) Nakkertok Nordic Ski Centre/Gatineau
  - Sprint Classical winners: (Canada) Dominique Moncion-Groulx (m) / (Canada) Maya MacIsaac-Jones (f)
  - Men's 15 km Classical winner: (Canada) Andy Shields
  - Women's 10 km Classical winner: (United States) Annie Hart
  - Men's 20 km Freestyle winner: (Canada) Russell Kennedy
  - Women's 15 km Freestyle winner: (United States) Annie Hart

=== 2016–17 Balkan Cup ===
- January 7 & 8: BC #1 in (Turkey) Gerede
  - Men's 10 km Classic winner: (Croatia) Edi Dadić
  - Women's 5 km Classic winner: (Croatia) Vedrana Malec
  - Men's 10 km Freestyle winner: (Croatia) Edi Dadić
  - Women's 5 km Freestyle winner: (Croatia) Vedrana Malec
- January 17 & 18: BC #2 in (Serbia) Zlatibor
  - Men's 15 km Freestyle winner: (Bulgaria) Veselin Tzinzov
  - Women's 10 km Freestyle winner: (Croatia) Vedrana Malec
  - Men's 10 km Freestyle winner: (Bulgaria) Veselin Tzinzov
  - Women's 5 km Freestyle winner: (Croatia) Vedrana Malec
- January 21 & 22: BC #3 in (Greece) Metsovo
  - Men's 10 km Freestyle winner: (Bulgaria) Veselin Tzinzov (2 times)
  - Women's 5 km Freestyle winner: (Bosnia and Herzegovina) Dejana Košarac (#1) / (Greece) Maria Tsakiri
- January 28 & 29: BC #4 in (Bosnia and Herzegovina) Pale
  - Men's 10 km Freestyle winner: (Bulgaria) Veselin Tzinzov
  - Women's 5 km Freestyle winner: (Bosnia and Herzegovina) Sanja Kusmuk
  - Men's 15 km Freestyle winner: (Bulgaria) Veselin Tzinzov
  - Women's 10 km Freestyle winner: (Bosnia and Herzegovina) Sanja Kusmuk
- February 4 & 5: BC #5 in (Croatia) Ravna Gora
  - Men's 10 km Classic winner: (Bulgaria) Veselin Tzinzov
  - Women's 5 km Classic winner: (Austria) Lisa Unterweger
  - Men's 10 km Freestyle winner: (Serbia) Damir Rastić
  - Women's 5 km Freestyle winner: (Austria) Lisa Unterweger
- February 14 & 15: BC #6 in (North Macedonia) Mavrovo
  - Men's 10 km Freestyle winners: (Croatia) Edi Dadić (#1) / (Bulgaria) Veselin Tzinzov (#2)
  - Women's 5 km Freestyle winners: (Bosnia and Herzegovina) Dejana Košarac (#1) / (Bosnia and Herzegovina) Sanja Kusmuk (#2)
- March 24 & 25: BC #7 (final) in (Bulgaria) Bansko
  - Men's 10 km Classic winner: (Bulgaria) Veselin Tzinzov
  - Women's 5 km Classic winner: (Bulgaria) Nansi Okoro
  - Men's 10 km Freestyle winner: (Serbia) Damir Rastić
  - Women's 5 km Freestyle winner: (Bulgaria) Stefani Popova

=== 2016–17 Scandinavian Cup ===
- December 9–11: SCAN #1 in (Norway) Lillehammer
  - Men's 1.5 km Sprint Classic winner: (Norway) Sindre Odberg Palm
  - Women's 1.3 km Sprint Classic winner: (Sweden) Anna Dyvik
  - Men's 10 km Freestyle winner: (Norway) Daniel Stock
  - Women's 5 km Freestyle winner: (Sweden) Charlotte Kalla
  - Men's 30 km Classic winner: (Norway) Niklas Dyrhaug
  - Women's 15 km Classic winner: (Sweden) Charlotte Kalla
- January 6–8: SCAN #2 in (Finland) Lahti
  - 1 km Sprint Classic winners: (Sweden) Oskar Svensson (m) / (Sweden) Hanna Falk (f)
  - Men's 15 km Classic winner: (Finland) Iivo Niskanen
  - Women's 10 km Classic winner: (Poland) Justyna Kowalczyk
- March 3–5: SCAN #3 (final) in (Latvia) Madona
  - 1 km Sprint Freestyle winners: (Norway) Håvard Solås Taugbøl (m) / (Sweden) Anna Dyvik (f)
  - Men's 10 km Classic winner: (Norway) Daniel Stock
  - Women's 5 km Classic winner: (Sweden) Maria Nordstroem
  - Men's 15 km Freestyle Pursuit winner: (Norway) Mathias Rundgreen
  - Women's 10 km Freestyle Pursuit winner: (Sweden) Linn Sömskar

=== 2016–17 Slavic Cup ===
- December 16–18: SC #1 in (Slovakia) Štrbské pleso
  - Men's 1.6 km Sprint Classic winners: (Belarus) Aliaksandr Voranau (#1) / (Czech Republic) Jan Barton (#2)
  - Women's 1.4 km Sprint Classic winners: (Slovakia) Alena Procházková (2 times)
  - Men's 10 km Freestyle winner: (Belarus) Mikhail Kuklin
  - Women's 7.5 km Freestyle winner: (Slovakia) Alena Procházková
- February 18 & 19: SC #2 in (Poland) Zakopane
  - Men's 10 km Classic winner: (Slovakia) Andrej Segeč
  - Women's 5 km Classic winner: (Poland) Urszula Łętocha
  - Men's 15 km Freestyle winner: (Poland) Andrzej Pradziad
  - Women's 10 km Freestyle winner: (Poland) Urszula Łętocha
- February 24–26: SC #3 in (Czech Republic) Jablonec nad Nisou
  - Men's 3 km Freestyle winner: (Czech Republic) Dušan Kožíšek
  - Women's 2 km Freestyle winner: (Czech Republic) Zuzana Staňková
  - Men's 10 km Classic winner: (Czech Republic) Luděk Šeller
  - Women's 5 km Classic winner: (Poland) Urszula Łętocha
  - Men's 10 km Freestyle Pursuit winner: (Czech Republic) Adam Fellner
  - Women's 5 km Freestyle Pursuit winner: (Czech Republic) Anna Sixtová
- March 11 & 12: SC #4 (final) in (Czech Republic) Harrachov
  - 1 km Sprint Classic winners: (Czech Republic) Michal Novák (m) / (Czech Republic) Karolína Grohová (f)
  - Men's 15 km Freestyle Pursuit winner: (Czech Republic) Martin Jakš
  - Women's 10 km Freestyle winner: (Czech Republic) Kateřina Beroušková

=== 2016–17 Eastern Europe Cup ===
- November 20–24, 2016: EEC #1 in (Russia) Vershina Tea
  - Men's 1.7 km Free winner: (Russia) Ivan Yakimushkin
  - Women's 1.3 km Free winner: (Russia) Polina Nekrasova
  - Men's 10 km Free winner: (Russia) Aleksey Chervotkin
  - Women's 5 km Free winner: (Russia) Anna Nechaevskaya
  - Men's 1.7 km Classic winner: (Russia) Aleksey Chervotkin
  - Women's 1.3 km Classic winner: (Russia) Polina Nekrasova
  - Men's 15 km Classic winner: (Russia) Alexey Vitsenko
  - Women's 10 km Classic winner: (Russia) Mariya Guschina
- December 20–22, 2016: EEC #2 in (Ukraine) Sianky
  - Men's 10 km Classic winner: (Belarus) Yury Astapenka
  - Women's 5 km Classic winner: (Ukraine) Tetyana Antypenko
  - Men's 15 km Classic winner: (Belarus) Yury Astapenka
  - Women's 10 km Classic winner: (Ukraine) Valentyna Shevchenko
  - 1.6 km Sprint Freestyle winners: (Ukraine) Ruslan Perekhoda (m) / (Ukraine) Tetyana Antypenko
- December 24–28, 2016: EEC #3 in (Russia) Krasnogorsk
  - 1.4 km Sprint Classic #1 winners: (Russia) Alexander Panzhinskiy (m) / (Russia) Natalya Matveyeva (f)
  - 1.4 km Sprint Classic #2 winners: (Russia) Alexander Bolshunov (m) / (Russia) Natalya Matveyeva (f)
  - Men's 15 km Freestyle winner: (Russia) Andrey Melnichenko
  - Women's 10 km Freestyle winner: (Russia) Anna Nechaevskaya
  - Men's 30 km Classic winner: (Russia) Alexander Bolshunov
  - Women's 15 km Classic winner: (Russia) Olga Rocheva
- January 11–15: EEC #4 in (Belarus) Minsk
  - 1.5 km Sprint Freestyle winners: (Russia) Andrey Parfenov (m) / (Belarus) Yulia Tikhonova (f)
  - Men's 15 km Classic winners: (Russia) Nikita Stupak (#1) / (Russia) Vladislav Skobelev (#2)
  - Women's 10 km Classic winners: (Poland) Justyna Kowalczyk (#1) / (Russia) Anna Nechaevskaya (#2)
- February 10: EEC #5 in (Russia) Krasnogorsk
  - Men's 15 km Classic winner: (Russia) Alexey Vitsenko
  - Women's 10 km Classic winner: (Russia) Zhanna Muraveva
- February 12: EEC #6 in (Russia) Moscow
  - 1.4 km Sprint Freestyle winners: (Russia) Nikolay Morilov (m) / (Russia) Maria Davydenkova (f)
- February 25 – March 1: EEC #7 (final) in (Russia) Syktyvkar
  - Men's 15 km Freestyle winner: (Russia) Ermil Vokuev
  - Women's 10 km Freestyle winner: (Russia) Anna Nechaevskaya
  - 1.4 km Sprint Freestyle winners: (Russia) Andrey Krasnov (m) / (Russia) Natalia Nepryaeva (f)
  - Skiathlon winners: (Russia) Denis Spitsov (m) / (Russia) Anna Nechaevskaya (f)

=== 2016–17 Far East Cup ===
- December 16 & 17: FEC #1 in (South Korea) Alpensia Resort
  - Sprint Classic winners: (Japan) Nobuhito Kashiwabara (m) / (Japan) Nanase Fujita (f)
  - Men's 15 km Freestyle winner: (Japan) Hikari Fujinoki
  - Women's 10 km Freestyle winner: (South Korea) Lee Chae-won
- December 26 & 27: FEC #2 in (Japan) Otoineppu, Hokkaido
  - Men's 10 km Classic winners: (Japan) Akira Lenting (#1) / (Japan) Keishin Yoshida (#2)
  - Women's 5 km Classic winners: (Japan) Masako Ishida (2 times)
- January 6: FEC #3 in (Japan) Sapporo
  - Men's 10 km Classic winner: (Japan) Keishin Yoshida
  - Women's 5 km Classic winner: (Japan) Yuki Kobayashi
- January 7: FEC #4 in (Japan) Sapporo
  - 1.4 km Sprint Classic winners: (Japan) Nobuhito Kashiwabara (m) / (Japan) Masako Ishida
- January 8: FEC #5 in (Japan) Sapporo
  - Men's 15 km Freestyle winner: (Japan) Keishin Yoshida
  - Women's 10 km Freestyle winner: (Japan) Masako Ishida
- January 15 & 16: FEC #6 (final) in (South Korea) Alpensia Resort
  - Men's 10 km Classic winner: (Japan) Akira Lenting
  - Women's 5 km Classic winner: (South Korea) Lee Chae-won
  - Men's 15 km Freestyle winner: (Japan) Akira Lenting
  - Women's 10 km Freestyle winner: (South Korea) Lee Chae-won

=== 2016–17 USSA Super Tour ===
- December 3 & 4: UST #1 in (United States) Rendezvous Ski Trails/West Yellowstone, Montana
  - Note: This event replaced Bozeman, Montana.
  - 1.5 km Freestyle winners: (United States) Matthew Gelso (m) / (United States) Jennie Bender (f)
  - Men's 15 km Classic winner: (United States) Matthew Gelso
  - Women's 10 km Classic winner: (United States) Elizabeth Guiney
- January 21 & 22: UST #2 in (United States) Soda Springs
  - Sprint Classic winners: (United States) Benjamin Lustgarten (m) / (United States) Jennie Bender (f)
- February 17–19: UST #3 in (United States) Al Quaal Recreation Area
  - 1.6 km Freestyle winners: (United States) Tyler Kornfield (m) / (United States) Julia Kern (f)
  - Men's 10 km Classic winner: (United States) David Norris
  - Women's 5 km Classic winner: (United States) Kaitlynn Miller
- March 27 – April 2: UST #4 in (United States) Birch Hill Recreation Area/Fairbanks (final)
  - Skiathlon winners: (United States) Scott Patterson (m) / (United States) Jessie Diggins (f)
  - Men's 1.5 km Freestyle winner: (United States) Logan Hanneman
  - Women's 1.4 km Freestyle winner: (United States) Jessie Diggins
  - Men's 50 km Must Start winner: (United States) Scott Patterson
  - Women's 30 km Must Start winner: (United States) Jessie Diggins

== Freestyle skiing ==
=== World Championships (Freestyle) ===
- March 6–19: FIS Freestyle Ski and Snowboarding World Championships 2017 in (Spain) Sierra Nevada
  - Aerials winners: (United States) Jonathon Lillis (m) / (United States) Ashley Caldwell (f)
  - Half-pipe winners: (United States) Aaron Blunk (m) / (Japan) Ayana Onozuka (f)
  - Moguls winners: (Japan) Ikuma Horishima (m) / (Australia) Britteny Cox (f)
  - Dual Moguls winners: (Japan) Ikuma Horishima (m) / (France) Perrine Laffont (f)
  - Ski Cross winners: (Sweden) Victor Öhling Norberg (m) / (Sweden) Sandra Näslund (f)
  - Slopestyle winners: (United States) McRae Williams (m) / (France) Tess Ledeux (f)
- March 26: FIS Junior Freestyle Ski World Championships 2017 (Half-pipe only) in (Switzerland) Crans-Montana
  - Half-pipe winners: (Switzerland) Rafael Kreienbuehl (m) / (Estonia) Kelly Sildaru (f)
- April 3–7: FIS Junior Freestyle Ski World Championships 2017 (AE, MO, DM, SS, & SX events) in (Italy) Chiesa in Valmalenco
  - Aerials winners: (Belarus) Dzmitry Mazurkevich (m) / (Russia) Liubov Nikitina (f)
  - Moguls winners: (United States) Jack Kariotis (m) / (United States) Trudy Mickel (f)
  - Dual Moguls winners: (Finland) Riku Voutilainen (m) / (United States) Olivia Giaccio (f)
  - Slopestyle winners: (Japan) Taisei Yamamoto (m) / (Estonia) Kelly Sildaru (f)
  - Ski Cross winners: (Germany) Florian Wilmsmann (m) / (Sweden) Sandra Näslund (f)

=== FIS Freestyle Skiing World Cup ===
- December 9, 2016 – March 26, 2017: 2016–17 FIS Freestyle Skiing World Cup

==== Moguls and Aerials ====
- December 10, 2016 – March 4, 2017: 2016–17 FIS Moguls and Aerials World Cup Schedule
  - December 10, 2016: MAWC #1 in (Finland) Ruka
    - Moguls winners: (Canada) Mikaël Kingsbury (m) / (Australia) Britteny Cox (f)
  - December 17 & 18, 2016: MAWC #2 in (China) Beijing (Beida Lake)
    - Individual aerials #1 winners: (Belarus) Anton Kushnir (m) / (China) Xu Mengtao (f)
    - Individual aerials #2 winners: (China) Qi Guangpu (m) / (Australia) Danielle Scott (f)
    - Team aerials winners: Russia (Aleksandra Orlova, Liubov Nikitina, Maxim Burov)
  - January 13 & 14: MAWC #3 in (United States) Lake Placid, New York
    - Moguls winners: (Kazakhstan) Dmitry Reiherd (m) / (Australia) Britteny Cox (f)
    - Aerials winners: (Belarus) Anton Kushnir (m) / (United States) Ashley Caldwell (f)
  - January 21: MAWC #4 in (Canada) Val Saint-Côme
    - Moguls winners: (Canada) Mikaël Kingsbury (m) / (Canada) Justine Dufour-Lapointe (f)
  - January 28: MAWC #5 in (Canada) Calgary
    - Moguls winners: (Australia) Matt Graham (m) / (Australia) Britteny Cox (f)
  - February 2–4: MAWC #6 in (United States) Deer Valley
    - Moguls winners: (Canada) Mikaël Kingsbury (m) / (United States) Morgan Schild (f)
    - Aerials winners: (China) Qi Guangpu (m) / (Australia) Lydia Lassila (f)
    - Dual Moguls winners: (Canada) Mikaël Kingsbury (m) / (Australia) Britteny Cox (f)
  - February 10 & 11: MAWC #7 in (South Korea) Bokwang
    - Aerials winners: (Belarus) Anton Kushnir (m) / (China) Xu Mengtao (f)
    - Moguls winners: (Canada) Mikaël Kingsbury (m) / (Australia) Britteny Cox (f)
  - February 18 & 19: MAWC #8 in (Japan) Tazawako
    - Moguls winners: (Canada) Mikaël Kingsbury (m) / (Australia) Britteny Cox (f)
    - Dual Moguls winners: (Canada) Mikaël Kingsbury (m) / (United States) Jaelin Kauf (f)
  - February 25: MAWC #9 in (Belarus) Minsk
    - Aerials winners: (China) WANG Xindi (m) / (Australia) Lydia Lassila (f)
  - February 25 & 26: MAWC #10 in (China) Thaiwoo (Hebei)
    - Moguls winners: (Canada) Mikaël Kingsbury (m) / (France) Perrine Laffont (f)
    - Dual Moguls winners: (Canada) Mikaël Kingsbury (m) / (Australia) Britteny Cox (f)
  - March 4: MAWC #11 (final) in (Russia) Moscow
    - Aerials winners: (China) ZHOU Hang (m) / (Australia) Lydia Lassila (f)

==== Half-pipe, Big air, and Slopestyle ====
- September 2, 2016 – March 25, 2017: 2016–17 FIS Half-pipe, Big air, and Slopestyle World Cup Schedule
  - September 2 & 3, 2016: HB&SWC #1 in (Chile) El Colorado
    - Big Air winners: (Sweden) Henrik Harlaut (m) / (Sweden) Emma Dahlström (f)
  - November 11, 2016: HB&SWC #2 in (Italy) Milan
    - Big Air winners: (Switzerland) Kai Mahler (m) / (Germany) Lisa Zimmermann (f)
  - December 2, 2016: HB&SWC #3 in (Germany) Mönchengladbach
    - Big Air winners: (Sweden) Henrik Harlaut (m) / (Italy) Silvia Bertagna (f)
  - December 15 & 17, 2016: HB&SWC #4 in (United States) Copper Mountain
    - Half-pipe winners: (France) Kevin Rolland (m) / (France) Marie Martinod (f)
  - January 13 & 14: HB&SWC #5 in (France) Font-Romeu
    - Slopestyle winners: (United States) McRae Williams (m) / (France) Tess Ledeux (f)
  - January 26–28: HB&SWC #6 in (Italy) Seiser Alm
    - Slopestyle winners: (United States) Colby Stevenson (m) / (Switzerland) Sarah Hoefflin (f)
  - February 1–5: HB&SWC #7 in (United States) Mammoth Mountain Ski Area
    - Note: The men's slopestyle event here was cancelled.
    - Half-pipe winners: (United States) Torin Yater-Wallace (m) / (France) Marie Martinod (f)
    - Women's Slopestyle winner: (United States) Maggie Voisin
  - February 9–12: HB&SWC #8 in (Canada) Quebec City
    - Big Air winners: (Switzerland) Kai Mahler (m) / (Switzerland) Mathilde Gremaud (f)
    - Slopestyle winners: (Switzerland) Andri Ragettli (m) / (Norway) Johanne Killi (f)
  - February 16 & 18: HB&SWC #9 in (South Korea) Bokwang
    - Half-pipe winners: (United States) Torin Yater-Wallace (m) / (France) Marie Martinod (f)
  - March 2 & 3: HB&SWC #10 in (Switzerland) Silvaplana
    - Slopestyle winners: (Canada) Teal Harle (m) / (United Kingdom) Isabel Atkin (f)
  - March 5 & 7: HB&SWC #11 in (France) Tignes
    - Half-pipe winners: (United States) Alex Ferreira (m) / (Canada) Cassie Sharpe (f)
  - March 24 & 25: HB&SWC #12 (final) in (Norway) Myrkdalen-Voss
    - Men's Big Air winners: (Norway) Christian Nummedal (#1) / (Norway) Birk Ruud (#2)
    - Women's Big Air winner: (Sweden) Emma Dahlström (2 times)

==== Ski cross ====
- December 8, 2016 – March 5, 2017: 2016–17 FIS Ski Cross World Cup Schedule
  - December 8–10, 2016: SCWC #1 in (France) Val Thorens
    - Ski cross #1 winners: (France) Jean-Frédéric Chapuis (m) / (Canada) Marielle Thompson (f)
    - Ski cross #2 winners: (Switzerland) Alex Fiva (m) / (Sweden) Anna Holmlund (f)
  - December 12 & 13, 2016: SCWC #2 in (Switzerland) Arosa
    - Ski cross winners: (Switzerland) Romain Detraz (m) / (Canada) Marielle Thompson (f)
  - December 16 & 17, 2016: SCWC #3 in (Austria) Montafon
    - Ski cross winners: (France) Jean-Frédéric Chapuis (m) / (Canada) Marielle Thompson (f)
  - December 20–22, 2016: SCWC #4 in (Italy) Innichen
    - Ski cross winners: (Slovenia) Filip Flisar (m; 2 times) / (Germany) Heidi Zacher (f; 2 times)
  - January 14 & 15: SCWC #5 in (Italy) Watles
    - Ski cross #1 winners: (Switzerland) Armin Niederer (m) / (Sweden) Sandra Näslund (f)
    - Ski cross #2 winners: (Switzerland) Alex Fiva (m) / (Canada) Marielle Thompson (f)
  - February 3–5: SCWC #6 in (Germany) Feldberg
    - Note: The second women's ski cross event here was cancelled.
    - Men's Ski cross winner: (France) Jean-Frédéric Chapuis (2 times)
    - Women's Ski cross winner: (Germany) Heidi Zacher
  - February 9–12: SCWC #7 in (Sweden) Idre
    - Ski cross #1 winners: (Switzerland) Alex Fiva (m) / (Sweden) Sandra Näslund (f)
    - Ski cross #2 winners: (Canada) Brady Leman (m) / (Canada) Marielle Thompson (f)
  - February 24 & 25: SCWC #8 in (Russia) Sunny Valley (Miass)
    - Ski cross winners: (France) Arnaud Bovolenta (m) / (Canada) Marielle Thompson (f)
  - March 5: SCWC #9 (final) in (Canada) Blue Mountain
    - Ski cross winners: (Canada) Brady Leman (m) / (Canada) Marielle Thompson (f)

=== 2016–17 Europa Cup ===
- November 26: FSEC #1 in (Austria) Stubai
  - Slopestyle winners: (France) Antoine Adelisse (m) / (France) Coline Ballet Baz (f)
- November 26 & 27: FSEC #2 in (Austria) Pitztal
  - Ski Cross winners: (Switzerland) Armin Niederer (m) / (Germany) Daniela Maier (f)
- December 1 & 2: FSEC #3 in (Finland) Ruka
  - Aerials #1 winners: (Russia) Maxim Burov (m) / (Australia) Danielle Scott (f)
  - Aerials #2 winners: (Russia) Maxim Burov (m) / (Australia) Danielle Scott (f)
- January 11 & 12: FSEC #4 in (France) Val Thorens
  - Men's Ski Cross winners: (Switzerland) Bryan Zooler (#1) / (France) François Place (#2)
  - Women's Ski Cross winners: (France) Amelie Schneider (#1) / (Sweden) Lisa Andersson (#2)
- January 20–22: FSEC #5 in (Austria) St Anton am Arlberg
  - Big Air winners: (Austria) Lukas Müllauer (m) / (Austria) Laura Wallner (f)
  - Slopestyle #1 winners: (Finland) Joona Sipola (m) / (Austria) Laura Wallner (f)
  - Slopestyle #2 winners: (Andorra) Carles Aguareles Loan (m) / (Sweden) Jennie-Lee Burmansson (f)
- January 26 & 27: FSEC #6 in (Switzerland) Lenk im Simmental
  - Men's Ski Cross winners: (New Zealand) Jamie Prebble (#1) / (Switzerland) Ryan Regez (#2)
  - Women's Ski Cross winners: (Sweden) Lisa Andersson (2 times)
- January 28 & 29: FSEC #7 in (France) Albiez-Montrond
  - Moguls winners: (Russia) Evgeniy Gedrovich (m) / (Norway) Kristine Gullachsen (f)
  - Dual Moguls winners: (France) Gaël Gaiddon (m) / (Sweden) Thea Wallberg (f)
- February 1–3: FSEC #8 in (Italy) Bardonecchia
  - Ski Cross #1 winners: (France) François Place (m) / (France) Amelie Schneider (f)
  - Ski Cross #1 winners: (France) François Place (m) / (Sweden) Lisa Andersson (f)
- February 9–12: FSEC #9 in Minsk
  - Aerials #1 winners: (Belarus) Artsiom Bashlakou (m) / (Switzerland) Carol Bouvard (f)
  - Aerials #2 winners: (Belarus) Artsiom Bashlakou (m) / (Switzerland) Carol Bouvard (f)
  - Team Aerials winners: Belarus (Hanna Yauseyenka, Dzmitry Mazurkevich, Artsiom Bashlakou)
- February 11 & 12: FSEC #10 in (Austria) Gaißau
  - Moguls #1 winners: (Sweden) Oskar Elofsson (m) / (Kazakhstan) Ayaulum Amrenova (f)
  - Moguls #2 winners: (Sweden) Loke Nilsson (m) / (Kazakhstan) Ayaulum Amrenova (f)
- February 11 & 12: FSEC #11 in (Germany) Grasgehren
  - Cancelled
- February 15–18: FSEC #12 in (Switzerland) Prato Leventina
  - Moguls winners: (Russia) Andrey Uglovski (m) / (Kazakhstan) Ayaulum Amrenova (f)
  - Dual Moguls #1 winners: (Russia) Evgeniy Gedrovich (m) / (United Kingdom) Léonie Gerken Schofield (f)
  - Dual Moguls #2 winners: (Sweden) Albin Holmgren (m) / (United Kingdom) Makayla Gerken-Schofield (f)
- February 18: FSEC #13 in (Germany) Bischofswiesen
  - Big Air winners: (Germany) Vincent Veile (m) / (Germany) Kea Deike Kuehnel (f)
- February 18 & 19: FSEC #14 in (Germany) Ebingen
  - Ski Cross #1 winners: (Austria) Robert Winkler (m) / (Sweden) Alexandra Edebo (f)
  - Ski Cross #2 winners: (France) François Place (m) / (Sweden) Alexandra Edebo (f)
- March 8 & 9: FSEC #15 in (France) Saint-François-Longchamp
  - Ski Cross winners: (France) Bastien Midol (m) / (Germany) Anna Wörner (f)
- March 10 & 11: FSEC #16 in (Slovenia) Vogel
  - Slopestyle #1 winners: (Denmark) Rasmus Dalberg Jørgensen (m) / (Austria) Elisabeth Gram (f)
  - Slopestyle #2 winners: (Italy) Yuri Silvestri (m) / (Italy) Sophia Insam (f)
- March 11 & 12: FSEC #17 in (Sweden) Kungsberget
  - Moguls winners: (Sweden) Loke Nilsson (m) / (Sweden) Frida Lundblad (f)
  - Dual Moguls winners: (Sweden) Albin Holmgren (m) / (Sweden) Frida Lundblad (f)
- March 17 & 18: FSEC #18 in (Bulgaria) Pamporovo
  - Note: The women's slopestyle events were cancelled.
  - Men's Slopestyle winner: (United States) Brandon Davis (2 times)
- March 18 & 19: FSEC #19 in (Sweden) Mora
  - Ski Cross #1 winners: (Austria) Robert Winkler (m) / (Sweden) Lisa Andersson
  - Ski Cross #2 winners: (France) Morgan Guipponi-Barfety (m) / (Sweden) Lisa Andersson
- March 19 & 20: FSEC #20 in (Finland) Jyväskylä
  - Dual Moguls #1 winners: (Finland) Jussi Penttala (m) / (Sweden) Frida Lundblad (f)
  - Dual Moguls #2 winners: (Finland) Jimi Salonen (m) / (Sweden) Thea Wallberg (f)
- March 24–27: FSEC #21 in (Switzerland) Airolo
  - Aerials #1 winners: (Switzerland) Dimitri Isler (m) / (Kazakhstan) Zhanbota Aldabergenova (f)
  - Aerials #2 winners: (Switzerland) Noe Roth (m) / (Kazakhstan) Zhanbota Aldabergenova (f)
  - Aerials #3 winners: (Switzerland) Nicolas Gygax (m) / (Kazakhstan) Zhanbota Aldabergenova (f)
- March 25 & 26: FSEC #22 in (Czech Republic) Pec pod Sněžkou
  - Slopestyle winners: (Finland) Elias Syrjä (m) / (Slovakia) Natália Šlepecká (f)
- March 30 & 31: FSEC #23 in (Italy) Chiesa in Valmalenco
  - Aerials #1 winners: (Russia) Maxim Burov (m) / (Russia) Liubov Nikitina (f)
  - Aerials #2 winners: (Belarus) Dzmitry Mazurkevich (m) / (Russia) Liubov Nikitina (f)
- March 30 & 31: FSEC #24 (final) in (Italy) Livigno
  - Slopestyle winners: (Switzerland) Colin Wili (m; 2 times) / (France) Elisa Nakab (f; 2 times)

=== 2016–17 Nor-Am Cup ===
- December 14–18: NAC #1 in (United States) Utah Olympic Park
  - Aerials #1 winners: (United States) Zachary Surdell (m) / (United States) Winter Vinecki (f)
  - Aerials #2 winners: (United States) Nik Seemann (m) / (United States) Winter Vinecki (f)
- January 6–8: NAC #2 in (Canada) Sunridge Ski Area
  - Ski Cross #1 winners: (Canada) Trent McCarthy (m) / (Canada) India Sherret (f)
  - Ski Cross #2 winners: (Canada) Trent McCarthy (m) / (Canada) Zoe Chore (f)
- January 13 & 14: NAC #3 in (Canada) Tabor Mountain Ski Resort
  - Men's Ski Cross winners: (Canada) Kevin MacDonald (2 times)
  - Women's Ski Cross winners: (Canada) India Sherret (#1) / (United States) Leah Emaus (#2)
- January 20: NAC#4/Super Continental Cup in (United States) Solitude Mountain Resort
  - Ski Cross winners: (Canada) David Duncan (m) / (Canada) Marielle Thompson (f)
- February 11 & 12: NAC #5 in (United States) Killington Ski Resort
  - Moguls winners: (United States) Emerson Smith (m) / (Canada) Valérie Gilbert (f)
  - Dual Moguls winners: (Canada) Gabriel Dufresne (m) / (United States) Lane Stoltzner (f)
- February 13–17: NAC #6 in (United States) Sunday River Resort
  - Ski Cross #1 winners: (Canada) Kevin MacDonald (m) / (Canada) Tiana Gairns (f)
  - Ski Cross #2 winners: (Canada) Reece Howden (m) / (Canada) Tiana Gairns (f)
- February 14 & 15: NAC #7 in (Canada) Val Saint-Côme Ski Resort #1
  - Aerials #1 winners: (United States) Thomas Coe (m) / (United States) Erica Stemler (f)
  - Aerials #2 winners: (United States) Thomas Coe (m) / (United States) Tyra Izor (f)
- February 16–18: NAC #8 in (United States) Aspen/Buttermilk
  - Slopestyle winners: (United States) Ethan Swadburg (m) / (Canada) Elena Gaskell (f)
  - Big Air winners: (United States) Mac Forehand (m) / (United States) Grace Henderson (f)
  - Halfpipe winners: (United States) Birk Irving (m) / (United States) Abigale Hansen (f)
- February 18 & 19: NAC #9 in (Canada) Val Saint-Côme Ski Resort #2
  - Moguls winners: (Canada) Elliot Vaillancourt (m) / (Canada) Berkley Brown (f)
  - Dual Moguls winners: (Canada) Simon Lemieux (m) / (Canada) Valérie Gilbert (f)
- February 19 & 20: NAC #10 in (United States) Lake Placid, New York
  - Aerials #1 winners: (United States) Patrick O'Flynn (m) / (United States) Megan Nick (f)
  - Aerials #2 winners: (United States) Nicholas Novak (m) / (United States) Kira Tanghe (f)
- February 20–25: NAC #11 in (United States) Ski Cooper
  - Ski Cross #1 winners: (Canada) Kevin MacDonald (m) / (Canada) India Sherret (f)
  - Ski Cross #2 winners: (Canada) Reece Howden (m) / (Canada) India Sherret (f)
- February 22–26: NAC #12 in (United States) Northstar California Resort
  - Moguls winners: (United States) Emerson Smith (m) / (United States) Lane Stoltzner (f)
  - Dual Moguls winners: (United States) Troy Tully (m) / (United States) Avital Shimko (f)
- February 24–26: NAC #13 in Canada Olympic Park
  - Halfpipe winners: (United States) Nick Goepper (m) / (United States) Carly Margulies (f)
  - Slopestyle winners: (Canada) Philippe Langevin (m) / (Canada) Sofia Tchernetsky (f)
- February 27 – March 3: NAC #14 in (United States) Utah Olympic Park
  - Aerials #1 winners: (United States) Nicholas Novak (m) / (United States) Madison Varmette (f)
  - Aerials #2 winners: (United States) Nicholas Novak (m) / (United States) Madison Varmette (f)
- March 3 & 4: NAC #15 in (Canada) Mount St. Louis Moonstone
  - Slopestyle winners: (Canada) Christian Stormgaard (m) / (Canada) Sofia Tchernetsky (f)
- March 4 & 5: NAC #16: in (Canada) Apex Mountain Resort
  - Moguls winners: (United States) Casey Andringa (m) / (United States) Avital Shimko (f)
  - Dual Moguls winners: (United States) Joel Hedrick (m) / (Canada) Berkley Brown (f)
- March 7 & 8: NAC #17 in (United States) Seven Springs Mountain Resort
  - Slopestyle winners: (Canada) Philippe Langevin (m) / (United States) Caroline Claire (f)
- March 7–9: NAC #18 (final) in (Canada) Blue Mountain
  - Ski Cross #1 winners: (United States) Brant Crossan (m) / (Canada) Marielle Thompson (f)
  - Ski Cross #2 winners: (Canada) Mathieu Leduc (m) / (United States) Tania Prymak (f)

=== 2016 FIS Freestyle Australia/New Zealand Cup ===
- August 2–5: ANC #1 in (Australia) Perisher Ski Resort #1
  - This event was cancelled due to unseasonable warm temperatures and rainfall.
- August 30 – September 2: ANC #2 in (Australia) Hotham Alpine Resort
  - Ski Cross #1 winners: (United States) Tyler Wallasch (m) / (Australia) Sami Kennedy-Sim (f)
  - Ski Cross #2 winners: (Australia) Anton Grimus (m) / (Australia) Sami Kennedy-Sim (f)
- September 3: ANC #3 in (Australia) Mount Buller Alpine Resort
  - Dual Moguls winners: (Australia) Brodie Summers (m) / (Australia) Britteny Cox (f)
- September 12–16: ANC #4 (final) in (New Zealand) Cardrona Alpine Resort
  - Slopestyle #1 winners: (United Kingdom) James Woods (m) / (Estonia) Kelly Sildaru (f)
  - Slopestyle #2 winners: (United Kingdom) James Woods (m) / (Estonia) Kelly Sildaru (f)
  - Halfpipe winners: (United States) Taylor Seaton (m) / (Estonia) Kelly Sildaru (f)

=== 2016 FIS Freestyle South American Cup ===
- August 4–6: SAC #1 in (Chile) La Parva
  - Ski Cross winners #1: (Canada) Ned Ireland (m) / (Chile) Magdalena Casas-Cordero (f)
  - Ski Cross winners #2: (Canada) Ned Ireland (m) / (Chile) Magdalena Casas-Cordero (f)
- August 17–20: SAC #2 in (Argentina) Cerro Catedral #1
  - Ski Cross winners #1: (United States) Thomas Hayward (m) / (Poland) Karolina Riemen
  - Ski Cross winners #2: (United States) Justin Wallisch (m) / (Poland) Karolina Riemen
- August 26 & 27: SAC #3 in (Chile) El Colorado
  - Big Air #1 winners: (Argentina) Mateo Cremer (m) / (Slovakia) Zuzana Stromková (f)
  - Big Air #2 winners: (Argentina) Mateo Cremer (m) / (Chile) Dominique Ohaco (f)
- September 12–14: SAC #4 (final) in (Argentina) Cerro Catedral #2
  - Slopestyle winners #1: (Argentina) Mateo Cremer (m)
  - Slopestyle winners #2: (Costa Rica) Andre Hamm (m) / (Russia) Elena Kostenko (f)

== Nordic combined ==
=== World Championships (NC) ===
- January 30 – February 5: Part of the 2017 Nordic Junior World Ski Championships in (United States) Park City, Utah
  - Individual normal hill/10 km winner: (Finland) Arttu Mäkiaho
  - Individual normal hill/5 km winner: (Germany) Vinzenz Geiger
  - Team normal hill/4 × 5 km winners: Austria (Samuel Mraz, Marc-Luis Rainer, Florian Dagn, & Mika Vermeulen)
- February 22 – March 5: Part of the FIS Nordic World Ski Championships 2017 in (Finland) Lahti
  - Individual normal hill/10 km winner: (Germany) Johannes Rydzek
  - Individual large hill/10 km winner: (Germany) Johannes Rydzek
  - Team normal hill/4 × 5 km winners: Germany (Björn Kircheisen, Eric Frenzel, Fabian Rießle, & Johannes Rydzek)
  - Team sprint large hill/2 × 7.5 km winners: Germany (Eric Frenzel & Johannes Rydzek)

=== 2016–17 FIS Nordic Combined World Cup ===
- August 27, 2016 – March 19, 2017: 2016–17 FIS Nordic Combined World Cup Schedule
  - August 27 & 28, 2016: NCWC #1 in Oberwiesenthal
    - Men's individual winner: (Norway) Jarl Magnus Riiber
    - Men's team winners: Germany (Björn Kircheisen & Eric Frenzel)
  - August 31, 2016: NCWC #2 in (Austria) Villach
    - Men's individual winner: (Austria) Mario Seidl
  - September 2 & 3, 2016: NCWC #3 in (Germany) Oberstdorf
    - Winners #1: (Norway) Jarl Magnus Riiber (m) / (Germany) Jenny Nowak (f)
    - Winners #2: (Germany) Jan Andersen (m) / (Austria) Timna Moser (f)
    - Winners #3: (Norway) Jarl Magnus Riiber (m) / (Germany) Jenny Nowak (f)
    - Winners #4: (Germany) Jan Andersen (m) / (Austria) Lisa Eder (f)
    - Men's individual winners: (Finland) Atte Kettunen (#1) / (Ukraine) Dmytro Mazurchuk (#2)
  - November 26 & 27, 2016: NCWC #4 in (Finland) Ruka
    - Men's individual winner: (Germany) Johannes Rydzek (2 times)
  - December 2–4, 2016: NCWC #5 in (Norway) Lillehammer
    - Men's individual winner: (Germany) Eric Frenzel (2 times)
    - Men's team winners: Germany (Björn Kircheisen, Eric Frenzel, Fabian Rießle, Johannes Rydzek)
  - December 17 & 18, 2016: NCWC #6 in (Austria) Ramsau
    - Men's individual winners: (Germany) Johannes Rydzek (#1) / (Germany) Eric Frenzel (#2)
  - January 7 & 8: NCWC #7 in (Finland) Lahti
    - Men's individual winners: (Germany) Eric Frenzel (#1) / (Germany) Fabian Rießle (#2)
  - January 13–15: NCWC #8 in (Italy) Fiemme Valley
    - Men's individual winner: (Germany) Eric Frenzel (2 times)
    - Men's team winners: Norway (Espen Andersen & Jørgen Graabak)
  - January 21 & 22: NCWC #9 in (France) Chaux-Neuve
    - Men's individual winners: (Germany) Johannes Rydzek (#1) / (Germany) Fabian Rießle (#2)
  - January 27–29: NCWC #10 in (Austria) Seefeld
    - Men's individual winners: (Germany) Johannes Rydzek (2 wins) / (Germany) Eric Frenzel (1 win)
  - February 4 & 5: NCWC #11 in (South Korea) Pyeongchang
    - Men's individual winner: (Germany) Johannes Rydzek (2 times)
  - February 10 & 11: NCWC #12 in (Japan) Sapporo
    - Men's individual winners: (Germany) Björn Kircheisen (#1) / (Japan) Akito Watabe (#2)
  - March 11: NCWC #13 in (Norway) Oslo
    - Men's individual winner: (Japan) Akito Watabe
  - March 15: NCWC #14 in (Norway) Trondheim
    - Men's individual winner: (Germany) Eric Frenzel
  - March 18 & 19: NCWC #15 (final) in (Germany) Schonach
    - Men's individual winner: (Germany) Eric Frenzel (2 times)

=== 2016–17 FIS Nordic Combined Grand Prix ===
- August 27 & 28, 2016: NCGP #1 in Oberwiesenthal
  - Winner: (Norway) Jarl Magnus Riiber
  - Teams winners: Germany 1 (Björn Kircheisen, Eric Frenzel)
- August 31, 2016: NCGP #2 in (Austria) Villach
  - Winner: (Austria) Mario Seidl
- September 2 & 3, 2016: NCGP #3 (final) in (Germany) Oberstdorf
  - Winner #1: (Norway) Jarl Magnus Riiber
  - Winner #2: (Norway) Jarl Magnus Riiber

=== 2016–17 FIS Nordic Combined Continental Cup ===
- December 15 & 18: COC #1 in (Germany) Klingenthal
  - Winner #1: (Germany) Maximilian Pfordte
  - Winner #2: (Germany) Tobias Simon
  - Winner #3: (Japan) Go Yamamoto
- January 7 & 8: COC #2 in (Norway) Hoeydalsmo
  - Winner #1: (Norway) Truls Soenstehagen Johansen
  - Winner #2: (France) Hugo Buffard
- January 14 & 15: COC #3 in (Finland) Rukatunturi
  - Winner #1: (Austria) Lukas Greiderer
  - Winner #2: (Norway) Sindre Ure Søtvik
- January 21 & 22: COC #4 in (Estonia) Otepää
  - Winner #1: (Estonia) Kristjan Ilves
  - Winner #2: (Austria) Martin Fritz
- February 11 & 12: COC #5 in (Austria) Eisenerz
  - Winner #1: (Estonia) Kristjan Ilves
  - Winner #2: (Estonia) Kristjan Ilves
- February 18 & 19: COC #6 in (Slovenia) Planica
  - Winner #1: (Austria) Lukas Klapfer
  - Winner #2: (Austria) Lukas Klapfer
- March 10–12: COC #7 (final) in (Russia) Nizhny Tagil
  - Winner #1: (Austria) Harald Lemmerer
  - Winner #2: (Germany) Tobias Simon
  - Winner #3: (Germany) Tobias Simon

=== 2016–17 FIS Nordic Combined Alpen Cup ===
- August 8, 2016: NCAP #1 in (Germany) Klingenthal
  - Winner: (Austria) Lisa Eder
- August 12, 2016: NCAP #2 in (Germany) Bischofsgrün
  - Winner: (Austria) Lisa Eder
- September 17 & 18, 2016: NCAP #3 in (Germany) Winterberg
  - Winner #1: (Germany) Justin Moczarski
  - Winner #2: (Germany) Justin Moczarski
- October 1 & 2, 2016: NCAP #4 in (Germany) Hinterzarten
  - Winner #1: (Germany) Simon Hüttel
  - Winner #2: (Austria) Christian Deuschl
- December 17 & 18: NCAP #5 in (Austria) Seefeld in Tirol
  - Winner #1: (Austria) Mika Vermeulen
  - Winner #2: (Slovenia) Vid Vrhovnik
- December 17 & 18: NCAP #6 in (Germany) Rastbuechl
  - Winner: (Italy) Lisa Moreschini
- January 13–15: NCAP #7 in (Germany) Schonach im Schwarzwald
  - Winner #1: (Austria) Mika Vermeulen
  - Winner #2: (Germany) Martin Hahn
- February 25–26: NCAP #8 in (Slovenia) Kranj
  - Winner #1: (Austria) Mika Vermeulen
  - Winner #2: (Germany) Jonas Welde
- March 3–5: NCAP #9 in (Germany) Hinterzarten
  - Winners #1: (Austria) Stefan Rettenegger (m) / (Germany) Jenny Nowak (f)
  - Winners #2: (Germany) Luis Lehnert (m) / (Germany) Alexandra Seifert (f)
  - Teams winners:
- March 11 & 12: NCAP #10 (final) in (France) Chaux-Neuve
  - Winners #1: (Germany) Luis Lehnert (m) / (France) Joséphine Pagnier (f)
  - Winners #2: (Italy) Aaron Kostner (m) / Women's is cancelled

== Nordic skiing ==
- January 30 – February 5: 2017 Nordic Junior World Ski Championships in (United States) Park City, Utah
  - Russia won both the gold and overall medal tallies.
- February 10–19: 2017 World Para Nordic Skiing Championships in (Germany) Finsterau
  - Ukraine won both the gold and overall medal tallies.
- February 22 – March 5: FIS Nordic World Ski Championships 2017 in (Finland) Lahti
  - Norway won both the gold and overall medal tallies.

== Ski jumping ==
=== World Championships (SJ) ===
- January 30 – February 5: Part of the 2017 Nordic Junior World Ski Championships in (United States) Park City, Utah
  - Individual winners: (Czech Republic) Viktor Polasek (m) / (Italy) Manuela Malsiner (f)
  - Men's team winners: Slovenia (Žiga Jelar, Tilen Bartol, Aljaž Osterc, & Bor Pavlovčič)
  - Women's team winners: Germany (Agnes Reisch, Luisa Görlich, Pauline Heßler, & Gianina Ernst)
  - Mixed team winners: Slovenia (Nika Križnar, Tilen Bartol, Ema Klinec, & Žiga Jelar)
- February 22 – March 5: Part of the FIS Nordic World Ski Championships 2017 in (Finland) Lahti
  - Individual normal hill winners: (Austria) Stefan Kraft (m) / (Germany) Carina Vogt (f)
  - Men's individual large hill winners: (Austria) Stefan Kraft
  - Men's team large hill winners: Poland (Piotr Żyła, Dawid Kubacki, Maciej Kot, & Kamil Stoch)
  - Mixed team normal hill winners: Germany (Carina Vogt, Markus Eisenbichler, Svenja Würth, & Andreas Wellinger)

=== 2016–17 Four Hills Tournament ===
- December 29 & 30, 2016: FHT #1 in (Germany) Oberstdorf #1
  - Winner: (Austria) Stefan Kraft
- December 31, 2016 & January 1, 2017: FHT #2 in (Germany) Garmisch-Partenkirchen
  - Winner: (Norway) Daniel-André Tande
- January 3 & 4: FHT #3 in (Austria) Innsbruck
  - Winner: (Norway) Daniel-André Tande
- January 5 & 6: FHT #4 (final) in (Austria) Bischofshofen
  - Winner: (Poland) Kamil Stoch

=== 2016–17 FIS Ski Jumping World Cup ===
- September 9–11, 2016: SJWC #1 in (Russia) Chaykovsky, Perm Krai
  - Winners #1: (Slovenia) Robert Kranjec (m) / (Japan) Sara Takanashi (f)
  - Winners #2: (Slovenia) Anže Semenič (m) / (Japan) Sara Takanashi (f)
- September 16–18, 2016: SJWC #2 in (Kazakhstan) Almaty
  - All events cancelled here.
- September 30 – October 2, 2016: SJWC #3 in (Austria) Hinzenbach #1
  - Men's Winner: (Poland) Maciej Kot (2 times)
- November 24–26, 2016: SJWC #4 in (Finland) Ruka
  - Men's Winners: (Slovenia) Domen Prevc (#1) / (Germany) Severin Freund (#2)
- December 1–3, 2016: SJWC #5 in (Norway) Lillehammer #1
  - Women's Winner: (Japan) Sara Takanashi (2 times)
- December 2–4, 2016: SJWC #6 in (Germany) Klingenthal
  - Men's Winner: (Slovenia) Domen Prevc
  - Team Winners: Poland (Piotr Żyła, Kamil Stoch, Dawid Kubacki, Maciej Kot)
- December 9–11, 2016: SJWC #7 in (Norway) Lillehammer #2
  - Note: The men's events was supposed to be hosted in Nizhny Tagil, but was cancelled.
  - Men's Winners: (Slovenia) Domen Prevc (#1) / (Poland) Kamil Stoch (#2)
- December 9–11, 2016: SJWC #8 in (Russia) Nizhny Tagil
  - Women's Winners: (Norway) Maren Lundby (#1) / (Japan) Sara Takanashi (#2)
- December 16–18, 2016: SJWC #9 in (Switzerland) Engelberg
  - Men's Winners: (Austria) Michael Hayböck (#1) / (Slovenia) Domen Prevc (#2)
- January 6–8: SJWC #10 in (Germany) Oberstdorf #2
  - Women's Winner: (Japan) Sara Takanashi (2 times)
- January 13–15: SJWC #11 in (Poland) Wisła
  - Men's Winner: (Poland) Kamil Stoch (2 times)
- January 13–15: SJWC #12 in (Japan) Sapporo #1
  - Women's Winners: (Japan) Yuki Ito (#1) / (Norway) Maren Lundby (#2)
- January 19–21: SJWC #13 in (Japan) Zaō, Miyagi
  - Women's Winner: (Japan) Yuki Ito (2 times)
- January 20–22: SJWC #14 in (Poland) Zakopane
  - Men's Winner: (Poland) Kamil Stoch
  - Team Winners: Germany (Markus Eisenbichler, Stephan Leyhe, Andreas Wellinger, Richard Freitag)
- January 27–29: SJWC #15 in (Germany) Willingen
  - Men's Winner: (Germany) Andreas Wellinger
  - Team Winners: Poland (Piotr Żyła, Dawid Kubacki, Maciej Kot, Kamil Stoch)
- January 27–29: SJWC #16 in (Romania) Râșnov
  - Women's Winners: (Norway) Maren Lundby (#1) / (Japan) Sara Takanashi (#2)
- February 3–5: SJWC #17 in (Germany) Oberstdorf #3
  - Men's Winner: (Austria) Stefan Kraft (2 times)
- February 3–5: SJWC #18 in (Austria) Hinzenbach #2
  - Women's Winner: (Japan) Sara Takanashi (2 times)
- February 10–12: SJWC #19 in (Japan) Sapporo #2
  - Men's Winners: (Poland) Maciej Kot (#1) / (Poland) Kamil Stoch (#2)
- February 11–12: SJWC #20 in (Slovenia) Ljubno
  - Women's Winners: (Norway) Maren Lundby (#1) / (Germany) Katharina Althaus (#2)
- February 14–16: SJWC #21 in (South Korea) Pyeongchang
  - Men's Winners: (Austria) Stefan Kraft (#1) / (Poland) Maciej Kot (#2)
  - Women's Winners: (Japan) Yuki Ito (#1) / (Japan) Sara Takanashi (#2)
- March 10–19: Raw Air 2017 (debut event)
  - March 10–12: SJWC #22 in (Norway) Oslo
    - Winners: (Austria) Stefan Kraft (m) / (Japan) Yuki Ito (f)
    - Men's Team Winners: Austria (Michael Hayböck, Manuel Fettner, Markus Schiffner, & Stefan Kraft)
  - March 13 & 14: SJWC #23 in (Norway) Lillehammer #3
    - Event cancelled.
  - March 15 & 16: SJWC #24 in (Norway) Trondheim
    - Men's Winner: (Austria) Stefan Kraft
  - March 17–19: SJWC #25 (RA 2017 final) in Vikersund
    - One of the men's events here was cancelled.
    - Men's Winner: (Poland) Kamil Stoch
    - Team Winners: Norway (Daniel-André Tande, Robert Johansson, Johann André Forfang, & Andreas Stjernen)
- March 23–26: SJWC #26 (final) in (Slovenia) Planica
  - Men's Winner: (Austria) Stefan Kraft (2 times)
  - Team Winners: Norway (Robert Johansson, Johann André Forfang, Anders Fannemel, & Andreas Stjernen)

=== 2016 FIS Ski Jumping Grand Prix ===
- July 15 & 16: SJGP #1 in (France) Courchevel
  - Winners: (Poland) Maciej Kot (m) / (Japan) Sara Takanashi (f)
- July 21–23: SJGP #2 in (Poland) Wisła
  - Individual winner: (Poland) Maciej Kot
  - Teams winner: Norway (Johann André Forfang, Tom Hilde, Joachim Hauer, Anders Fannemel)
- July 29 & 30: SJGP #3 in (Germany) Hinterzarten
  - Winner: (Germany) Andreas Wellinger
- August 5 & 6: SJGP #4 in (Switzerland) Einsiedeln
  - Winner: (Poland) Maciej Kot
- August 26–28: SJGP #5 in (Japan) Hakuba
  - Winner #1: (Norway) Anders Fannemel
  - Winner #2: (Japan) Taku Takeuchi
- September 9–11: SJGP #6 in (Russia) Chaykovsky
  - Winners #1: (Slovenia) Robert Kranjec (m) / (Japan) Sara Takanashi (f)
  - Winners #2: (Slovenia) Anže Semenič (m) / (Japan) Sara Takanashi (f)
- September 16–18: SJGP #7 in (Kazakhstan) Almaty
  - Event cancelled, due to preparations for the 2017 Winter Universiade.
- September 30 & October 1: SJGP #8 in (Austria) Hinzenbach
  - Winner: (Poland) Maciej Kot (m; 2 times)
- October 2: SJGP #9 (final) in (Germany) Klingenthal
  - Winner: (Poland) Maciej Kot (m; 2 times)

=== 2016–17 FIS Ski Jumping Continental Cup ===
Summer

- July 1 & 2, 2016: CC #1 in (Slovenia) Kranj
  - Winner #1: (Slovenia) Peter Prevc
  - Winner #2: (Slovenia) Peter Prevc
- August 18–21, 2016: CC #2 in (Finland) Kuopio
  - Winner #1: (Finland) Jarkko Määttä
  - Winner #2: (Norway) Jarl Magnus Riiber
- August 26 & 27, 2016: CC #3 in (Czech Republic) Frenštát pod Radhoštěm
  - Winner #1: (Czech Republic) Lukáš Hlava
  - Winner #2: (Poland) Aleksander Zniszczoł
- August 26–28, 2016: CC #4 in (Germany) Oberwiesenthal
  - Winner: (France) Lucile Morat (2 times)
- September 10 & 11, 2016: CC #5 in (Norway) Lillehammer
  - Winners #1: (Norway) Joacim Ødegård Bjøreng (m) / (Norway) Thea Sofie Kleven (f)
  - Winners #2: (Germany) Markus Eisenbichler (m) / The women's event was cancelled.
- September 17 & 18, 2016: CC #6 in (Austria) Stams
  - Winner #1: (Germany) Markus Eisenbichler (2 times)
- September 24 & 25, 2016: CC #7 in (Poland) Wisła
  - Winner #1: (Italy) Davide Bresadola
  - Winner #2: (Germany) Markus Eisenbichler
- September 30 & October 1, 2016: CC #8 in (Germany) Klingenthal
  - Winner #1: (Germany) Markus Eisenbichler
  - Winner #2: (Slovenia) Jurij Tepeš

Winter

- December 9–11, 2016: CC #9 in (Norway) Vikersundbakken
  - Winner #1: (Slovenia) Cene Prevc
  - Winner #2: (Slovenia) Cene Prevc
  - Winner #3: (Slovenia) Anže Semenič
- December 15–17, 2016 CC #10 in (Norway) Notodden
  - Women's winners: (France) Josephine Pagnier (2 times)
- December 17 & 18, 2016: CC #11 in (Finland) Rukatunturi
  - Winner #1: (Austria) Ulrich Wohlgenannt
  - Winner #2: (Austria) Elias Tollinger
- December 27 & 28, 2016: CC #12 in (Switzerland) Engelberg
  - Winner #1: (Norway) Halvor Egner Granerud
  - Winner #2: (Austria) Daniel Huber
- January 7 & 8: CC #13 in (Germany) Titisee-Neustadt
  - Winner #1: (Norway) Johann André Forfang
  - Winner #2: (Czech Republic) Viktor Polášek
- January 14 & 15: CC #14 in (Germany) Garmisch-Partenkirchen
  - Winner #1: (Slovenia) Anže Lanišek
  - Winner #2: (Slovenia) Miran Zupančič
- January 20–22: CC #15 in (Japan) Sapporo
  - Winner #1: (Slovenia) Miran Zupančič
  - Winner #2: (Austria) Clemens Aigner
  - Winner #3: (Germany) Andreas Wank
- January 28 & 29: CC #16 in (Austria) Bischofshofen
  - Winner #1: (Austria) Clemens Aigner
  - Winner #2: (Czech Republic) Tomáš Vančura
- February 4 & 5: CC #17 in (Turkey) Erzurum
  - Winner #1: (Slovenia) Nejc Dežman
  - Winner #2: (Slovenia) Nejc Dežman
- February 11 & 12: CC #18 in (Germany) Brotterode
  - Winner #1: (Slovenia) Nejc Dežman
  - Winner #2: (Germany) Felix Hoffmann
- February 18 & 19, 2017: CC #19 in (Slovenia) Planica
  - Winner #1: (Slovenia) Bor Pavlovčič
  - Winner #2: (Slovenia) Tilen Bartol
- February 25 & 26: CC #20 in (United States) Iron Mountain, Michigan
  - Winner #1: (Austria) Stefan Huber
  - Winner #2: (Norway) Halvor Egner Granerud
- March 4 & 5: CC #21 in (Norway) Rena
  - Winners: (Austria) Clemens Aigner (2 times)
- March 11 & 12: CC #22 in (Poland) Zakopane
  - Winners: (Austria) Clemens Aigner (2 times)
- March 18 & 19: CC #23 in (Russia) Chaykovsky (final)
  - Winner #1: (Germany) Constantin Schmid
  - Winner #2: (Austria) Clemens Aigner

=== 2016–17 FIS Ski Jumping Alpen Cup ===
- August 7 & 8, 2016: OPA #1 in (Germany) Klingenthal
  - Winner #1: (Hungary) Virág Vörös (2 times)
- August 10 & 11, 2016: OPA #2 in (Germany) Pöhla
  - Winner #1: (Hungary) Virág Vörös
  - Winner #2: (Austria) Lisa Eder
- August 12 & 13, 2016: OPA #3 in (Germany) Bischofsgrün
  - Winner #1: (Austria) Lisa Eder
  - Winner #2: (Hungary) Virág Vörös
- September 10 & 11, 2016: OPA #4 in (Switzerland) Einsiedeln
  - Winners #1: (Germany) Felix Hoffmann (m) / (Slovenia) Kaja Urbanija Čož (f)
  - Winners #2: (Slovenia) Aljaž Osterc (m) / (Slovenia) Jerneja Brecl (f)
- September 30 & October 1, 2016: OPA #5 in (Germany) Hinterzarten
  - Winner #1: (Slovenia) Bor Pavlovčič
  - Winner #2: (Austria) Maximilian Schmalnauer
- December 16 & 17, 2016: OPA #6 in (Germany) Rastbuechl
  - Winner #1: (Slovenia) Katra Komar
  - Winner #2: (Slovenia) Jerneja Brecl
- December 17 & 18, 2016: OPA #6 in (Austria) Seefeld in Tirol
  - Winners: (Slovenia) Aljaž Osterc (2 times)
- January 13 & 14: OPA #7 in (Germany) Schonach im Schwarzwald
  - Winners #1: (Slovenia) Rok Tarman (m) / (France) Joséphine Pagnier (f)
  - Winners #2: (Slovenia) Žiga Jelar (m) / (Slovenia) Jerneja Brecl (f)
- January 21 & 22, 2017: OPA #7 in (Slovenia) Žiri
  - Winners: (Slovenia) Katra Komar (2 times)
- February 25 & 26, 2017: OPA #8 in (Slovenia) Kranj
  - Winner #1: (Slovenia) Tilen Bartol
  - Winner #2: (Slovenia) Blaž Pavlič
- March 4 & 5: OPA #9 in (Germany) Hinterzarten
  - Winners #1: (Austria) David Haagen (m) / (France) Joséphine Pagnier (f)
  - Winners #2: (Slovenia) Timi Zajc (m) / (Austria) Marita Kramer (f)
  - Teams winners:
- March 11 & 12: OPA #10 (final) in (France) Chaux-Neuve
  - Winners #1: (Slovenia) Žiga Jelar (m) / (Slovenia) Katra Komar (f)
  - Winners #2: (Germany) Moritz Baer (m) / (Germany) Selina Freitag (f)

=== 2016–17 FIS Ski Jumping Cup ===
- July 2 & 3: FC #1 in (Austria) Villach
  - Winners #1: (Japan) Yuken Iwasa (m) / (Slovenia) Eva Logar (f)
  - Winners #2: (Italy) Sebastian Colloredo (m) / (Slovenia) Eva Logar (f)
- July 9 & 10: FC #2 in (Poland) Szczyrk
  - Winners #1: (Italy) Davide Bresadola (m) / (Poland) Kinga Rajda (f)
  - Winners #2: (Italy) Davide Bresadola (m) / (Poland) Kinga Rajda (f)
- August 18–21: FC #3 in (Finland) Kuopio
  - Men's winners: (Poland) Jan Ziobro (2 times)
- September 3 & 4: FC #4 in (Switzerland) Einsiedeln
  - Winners #1: (Slovenia) Aljaž Osterc (m) / (Germany) Selina Freitag (f)
  - Winners #2: (Slovenia) Aljaž Osterc (m) / (Romania) Daniela Haralambie (f)
- September 17 & 18: FC #5 in (Germany) Hinterzarten
  - Winners #1: (Slovenia) Aljaž Osterc (m) / (Germany) Carina Vogt (f)
  - Winners #2: (Japan) Yūken Iwasa / (Germany) Anna Rupprecht (f)
- September 30 & October 1: FC #6 in (Romania) Râșnov
  - Winners #1: (Austria) Stefan Huber (m) / (Romania) Daniela Haralambie (f)
  - Winners #2: (Poland) Paweł Wąsek (m) / (Romania) Daniela Haralambie (f)
- December 15 & 16: FC #7 in (Norway) Notodden
  - Winners: (Austria) Maximilian Steiner (m) / (Germany) Luisa Görlich (f)
  - Men's winner: (Austria) Maximilian Steiner
- January 7 & 8: FC #8 in (Poland) Zakopane
  - Men's winners: (Austria) Ulrich Wohlgenannt (2 times)
- January 27 & 28: FC #9 in (United States) Eau Claire, Wisconsin
  - Winners #1: (Germany) Moritz Baer (m) / (Japan) Fumika Segawa (f)
  - Winners #2: (Finland) Eetu Nousiainen (m) / (Japan) Rio Seto (f)
- March 3–5: FC #10 (final) in (Japan) Sapporo
  - Winner #1: (Japan) Yūken Iwasa
  - Winner #2: (Germany) Pius Paschke

== Snowboarding ==
=== World Championships (SB) ===
- February 1–8: 2017 World Para Snowboard Championships in (Canada) Big White
  - The Netherlands won the gold medal tally. The United States won the overall medal tally.
- February 18–21: FIS Snowboarding Junior World Championships 2017 (SBX and AS events) in (Czech Republic) Klínovec
  - Snowboard Cross winners: (Switzerland) Kalle Koblet (m) / (Russia) Kristina Paul (f)
  - Team Snowboard Cross winners: The United States (Jake Vedder & Senna Leith) (m) / France (Manon Petit & Julia Pereira) (f)
  - Parallel giant slalom winners: (Russia) Dmitry Sarsembaev (m) / (Russia) Milena Bykova (f)
  - Parallel slalom winners: (Russia) Ilia Vitugov (m) / (Austria) Jemima Juritz (f)
- March 7–19: FIS Freestyle Ski and Snowboarding World Championships 2017 in (Spain) Sierra Nevada
  - Big Air winners: (Norway) Ståle Sandbech (m) / (Austria) Anna Gasser (f)
  - Half-pipe winners: (Australia) Scott James (m) / (China) Cai Xuetong (f)
  - Parallel giant slalom winners: (Austria) Andreas Prommegger (m) / (Czech Republic) Ester Ledecká (f)
  - Parallel slalom winners: (Austria) Andreas Prommegger (m) / (Austria) Daniela Ulbing (f)
  - Slopestyle winners: (Belgium) Seppe Smits (m) / (Canada) Laurie Blouin (f)
  - Snowboard Cross winners: (France) Pierre Vaultier (m) / (United States) Lindsey Jacobellis (f)
  - Team Snowboard Cross winners: United States (Hagen Kearney & Nick Baumgartner) (m) / France (Nelly Moenne Loccoz & Chloé Trespeuch) (f)
- March 30 – April 1: FIS Snowboarding Junior World Championships 2017 (FS events only) in (Czech Republic) Špindlerův Mlýn
  - Men's winners: (Japan) Yuri Okubo (Big Air) / (United States) Chris Corning (Slopestyle)
  - Women's Big Air and Slopestyle winner: (Australia) Tess Coady

=== Alpine snowboarding ===
- December 15, 2016: ASWC #1 in (Italy) Carezza
  - Parallel giant slalom winners: (Austria) Benjamin Karl (m) / (Austria) Ina Meschik (f)
- December 17, 2016: ASWC #2 in (Italy) Cortina d'Ampezzo
  - Parallel slalom winners: (Russia) Andrey Sobolev (m) / (Czech Republic) Ester Ledecká (f)
- January 10 & 11: ASWC #3 in Bad Gastein
  - Parallel slalom winners: (Italy) Christoph Mick (m) / (Austria) Daniela Ulbing (f)
  - Team Parallel slalom winners: Austria (Daniela Ulbing & Benjamin Karl)
- January 28: ASWC #4 in (Slovenia) Rogla Ski Resort
  - Parallel giant slalom winners: (Switzerland) Nevin Galmarini (m) / (Czech Republic) Ester Ledecká (f)
- February 3 & 5: ASWC #5 in (Bulgaria) Bansko
  - Parallel giant slalom #1 winners: (Bulgaria) Radoslav Yankov (m) / (Switzerland) Patrizia Kummer (f)
  - Parallel giant slalom #2 winners: (France) Sylvain Dufour (m) / (Russia) Alena Zavarzina (f)
- February 12: ASWC #6 in (South Korea) Bokwang
  - Parallel giant slalom winners: (Austria) Andreas Prommegger (m) / (Russia) Alena Zavarzina (f)
- February 25: ASWC #7 in (Russia) Moscow-Shukolovo
  - Note 1: This event was supposed to be hosted in Kazan, but it was cancelled due to alleged financial reasons.
  - Note 2: This event was cancelled again, but the reasons are unknown this time.
- March 5: ASWC #8 in (Turkey) Kayseri
  - Parallel giant slalom winners: (Austria) Andreas Prommegger (m) / (Czech Republic) Ester Ledecká (f)
- March 17–19: ASWC #9 (final) in (Germany) Winterberg
  - Parallel slalom winners: (Germany) Stefan Baumeister (m) / (Austria) Sabine Schoeffmann (f)
  - Team Parallel slalom winners: Italy (Nadya Ochner & Aaron March)

=== Snowboard cross ===
- December 15–18, 2016: SBXWC #1 in (Austria) Montafon
  - Snowboard Cross winners: (United States) Hagen Kearney (m) / (Australia) Belle Brockhoff (f)
  - Team Snowboard Cross winners: Spain (Regino Hernández & Lucas Eguibar) (m) / France (Nelly Moenne Loccoz & Chloé Trespeuch) (f)
- January 19–22: SBXWC #2 in Solitude Mountain Resort
  - Snowboard Cross winners: (Austria) Alessandro Hämmerle (m) / (Czech Republic) Eva Samková (f)
  - Team Snowboard Cross winners: Italy (Luca Matteotti & Emanuel Perathoner) (m) / United States (Lindsey Jacobellis & Rosina Mancari) (f)
- February 2 & 4: SBXWC #3 in (Bulgaria) Bansko
  - Snowboard Cross winners: (Austria) Alessandro Hämmerle (m) / (Australia) Belle Brockhoff (f)
- February 10–12: SBXWC #4 in (Germany) Feldberg
  - Snowboard Cross #1 winners: (France) Pierre Vaultier (m) / (Italy) Michela Moioli (f)
  - Snowboard Cross #2 winners: (Australia) Alex Pullin (m) / (Czech Republic) Eva Samková (f)
- February 24 & 26: SBXWC #5 in (Russia) Kazan
  - Event cancelled, due to alleged financial reasons.
- March 4 & 5: SBXWC #6 in (Spain) La Molina
  - Snowboard Cross winners: (France) Pierre Vaultier (m) / (Italy) Michela Moioli (f)
- March 24–26: SBXWC #7 (final) in (Switzerland) Veysonnaz
  - Snowboard Cross winners: (France) Pierre Vaultier (m) / (France) Charlotte Bankes (f)
  - Team Snowboard Cross winners: Austria (Markus Schairer & Alessandro Hämmerle) (m) / Italy (Raffaella Brutto & Michela Moioli) (f)

=== Freestyle snowboarding ===
- November 12, 2016: FSWC #1 in (Italy) Milan
  - Big Air winners: (Norway) Marcus Kleveland (m) / (Austria) Anna Gasser (f)
- November 25 & 26, 2016: FSWC #2 in (South Korea) Alpensia Resort
  - Big Air winners: (Canada) Mark McMorris (m) / (Austria) Anna Gasser (f)
- December 3, 2016: FSWC #3 in (Germany) Mönchengladbach
  - Big Air winners: (Finland) Roope Tonteri (m) / (Austria) Anna Gasser (f)
- December 14–17, 2016: FSWC #4 in (United States) Copper Mountain
  - Big Air winners: (Canada) Maxence Parrot (m) / (United States) Jamie Anderson (f)
  - Half-pipe winners: (Switzerland) Patrick Burgener (m) / (United States) Chloe Kim (f)
- January 7: FSWC #5 in (Russia) Moscow
  - Big Air winners: (Russia) Vlad Khadarin (m) / (United Kingdom) Katie Ormerod (f)
- January 13 & 14: FSWC #6 in (Austria) Kreischberg
  - Slopestyle winners: (Norway) Mons Røisland (m) / (Austria) Anna Gasser (f)
- January 16–21: FSWC #7 in (Switzerland) Laax
  - Slopestyle winners: (Canada) Maxence Parrot (m) / (Finland) Enni Rukajärvi (f)
  - Half-pipe winners: (United States) Josey Chase (m) / (United States) Chloe Kim (f)
- January 25 & 27: FSWC #8 in (Italy) Seiser Alm
  - Slopestyle winners: (Belgium) Seppe Smits (m) / (Finland) Enni Rukajärvi (f)
- February 1–5: FSWC #9 in (United States) Mammoth Mountain Ski Area
  - Slopestyle winners: (United States) Redmond Gerard (m) / (United States) Jamie Anderson (f)
  - Half-pipe winners: (United States) Shaun White (m) / (United States) Kelly Clark (f)
- February 9–12: FSWC #10 in (Canada) Quebec City
  - Big Air winners: (Canada) Mark McMorris (m) / (Austria) Anna Gasser (f)
  - Slopestyle winners: (Canada) Sebastien Toutant (m) / (United States) Julia Marino (f)
- February 17 & 19: FSWC #11 in (South Korea) Bokwang
  - Half-pipe winners: (Australia) Scott James (m) / (United States) Kelly Clark (f)
- March 24 & 25: FSWC #12 (final) in (Czech Republic) Špindlerův Mlýn
  - Slopestyle winners: (United States) Chris Corning (m) / (New Zealand) Zoi Sadowski Synnott (f)

=== 2016–17 Europa Cup ===
- November 3 & 4, 2016: EC #1 in (Netherlands) Landgraaf
  - Parallel slalom #1 winners: (Italy) Maurizio Bormolini (m) / (Netherlands) Michelle Dekker (f)
  - Parallel slalom #2 winners: (Italy) Maurizio Bormolini (m) / (Germany) Carolin Langenhorst (f)
- November 9 & 10, 2016: EC #2 in (Netherlands) Landgraaf
  - Slopestyle #1 winners: (Netherlands) Erik Bastiaansen (m) / (Netherlands) Babs Barnhoorn (f)
  - Slopestyle #2 winners: (Netherlands) Max de Vries (m) / (Netherlands) Babs Barnhoorn (f)
- November 26 & 27, 2016: EC #3 in (Austria) Kaunertal
  - Big Air winners: (Italy) Davide Boggio (m) / (Russia) Elena Kostenko (f)
  - Slopestyle winners: (United States) Lyon Farrell (m) / (Czech Republic) Katerina Vojackova (f)
- November 30 & December 1, 2016: EC #4 in (Austria) Pitztal
  - Snowboardcross #1 winners: (Spain) Lucas Eguibar (m) / (Australia) Belle Brockhoff (f)
  - Snowboardcross #2 winners: (Spain) Lucas Eguibar (m) / (Australia) Belle Brockhoff (f)
- December 10 & 11, 2016: EC #5 in (Germany) Hochfügen
  - Parallel giant slalom #1 winners: (France) Sylvain Dufour (m) / (Russia) Elizaveta Salikhova (f)
  - Parallel giant slalom #2 winners: (France) Sylvain Dufour (m) / (Russia) Ekaterina Khatomchenkova (f)
- December 15 & 16, 2016: EC #6 in (France) Val Thorens
  - Snowboardcross #1 winners: (Australia) Adam Lambert (m) / (France) Gaia Tarasco (f)
  - Snowboardcross #2 winners: (Australia) Adam Lambert (m) / (Italy) Sofia Belingheri (f)
- January 7 & 8: EC #7 in (Austria) Gerlitzen
  - Parallel giant slalom #1 winners: (Slovenia) Jure Hafner (m) / (Poland) Weronika Biela (f)
  - Parallel giant slalom #2 winners: (South Korea) Bo-Gun Choi (m) / (Switzerland) Nicole Baumgartner
- January 20 & 21: EC #8 in (Italy) Pila
  - Cancelled
- January 20 & 21: EC #9 in (Italy) Livigno
  - Men's Parallel giant slalom winners: (Italy) Maurizio Bormolini (#1) / (South Korea) Kim Sang-kyum (#2)
  - Women's Parallel giant slalom winners: (Italy) Nadya Ochner (#1) / (Germany) Selina Jörg (#2)
- January 24 & 25: EC #10 in (France) Vars
  - Slopestyle #1 winners: (Norway) Bendik Gjerdalen (m) / (Finland) Carola Niemelä (f)
  - Slopestyle #2 winners: (Japan) Takeru Otsuka (m) / (Finland) Emmi Parkkisenniemi (f)
- January 28 & 29: EC #11 in (Germany) Grasgehren
  - Snowboardcross #1 winners: (Australia) Adam Lambert (m) / (France) Julia Pereira (f)
  - Snowboardcross #2 winners: (Netherlands) Glenn de Blois (m) / (France) Gaia Tarasco (f)
- January 28 & 29: EC #12 in (France) Font-Romeu-Odeillo-Via
  - Big Air #1 winners: (France) Enzo Valax (m) / (Russia) Elena Kostenko (f)
  - Big Air #2 winners: (France) Enzo Valax (m) / (Russia) Elena Kostenko (f)
- January 31 & February 1: EC #13 in (Slovenia) Maribor
  - Cancelled
- February 3 & 4: EC #13 in (France) Puy-Saint-Vincent
  - Men's Snowboardcross winners: (Switzerland) Nick Watter (#1) / #2 is cancelled
  - Women's Snowboardcross winners: (Italy) Francesca Gallina (#1) / #2 is cancelled
- February 11 & 12: EC #14 in (Bosnia and Herzegovina) Sarajevo
  - Big Air winners: (Italy) Nicola Liviero (m) / (Belarus) Maryia Masla (f)
- February 17: EC #15 in (Germany) Bischofswiesen/Goetschen
  - Big Air winners: (Belgium) Stef Vandeweyer (m) / (Sweden) Louise Nordström (f)
- February 23–26: EC #16 in (Italy) Colere
  - Men's Snowboardcross winners: (Germany) Paul Berg (#1) / (France) Ken Vuagnoux (#2)
  - Women's Snowboardcross winners: (Italy) Sofia Belingheri (#1) / (Italy) Francesca Gallina (#2)
- February 24 & 25: EC #17 in (Switzerland) Davos
  - Halfpipe winners: (South Korea) CHO Hyeon-Min (m) / (Switzerland) Carla Somaini (f)
  - Big Air winners: (Switzerland) Moritz Boll (m) / (Chile) Antonia Yañez (f)
- February 25 & 26: EC #18 in (Switzerland) Lenzerheide
  - Men's Parallel slalom winners: (Switzerland) Dario Caviezel (#1) / (Austria) Sebastian Kislinger (#2)
  - Women's Parallel slalom winners: (Austria) Sabine Schöffmann (2 times)
- February 25 & 26: EC #19 in (Turkey) Erzurum
  - Cancelled
- March 4 & 5: EC #20 in (Serbia) Kopaonik
  - Big Air #1 winners: (Italy) Nicola Liviero (m) / (Croatia) Lea Jugovac (f)
  - Big Air #2 winners: (Russia) Nikita Tiuterev (m) / (Russia) Elena Kostenko (f)
- March 13 & 14: EC #21 in (Bulgaria) Pamporovo
  - Women's Slopestyle winners:
- March 16 & 17: EC #22 in (Slovenia) Rogla
  - Cancelled
- March 16–19: EC #23 in (Switzerland) Laax
  - Slopestyle winners: (Austria) Simon Gschaider (m) / (Finland) Elli Pikkujämsä (f)
  - Halfpipe winners: (Switzerland) Patrick Burgener (m) / (Switzerland) Verena Rohrer (f)
- March 17 & 18: EC #24 in (Austria) Radstadt
  - Parallel slalom #1 winners: (Austria) Johann Stefaner (m) / (Russia) Milena Bykova (f)
  - Parallel slalom #2 winners: (Austria) Johann Stefaner (m) / (Italy) Elisa Profanter (f)
- March 17 & 18: EC #25 in (Switzerland) Lenk
  - Snowboardcross #1 winners: (Austria) Hanno Douschan (m) / (France) Julia Pereira (f)
- March 24–26: EC #26 in (Austria) Kühtai
  - Note: The women's Big Air event was cancelled.
  - Big Air winner: (Austria) Moritz Amsuess
  - Halfpipe winners: (United States) Toby Miller (m) / (Germany) Leilani Ettel (f)
- March 25 & 26: EC #27 in (Italy) Ratschings
  - Parallel slalom #1 winners: (Austria) Lukas Mathies (m) / (Switzerland) Ladina Jenny (f)
  - Parallel slalom #2 winners: (Germany) Stefan Baumeister (m) / (Austria) Jemima Juritz (f)
- March 28 & 29: EC #28 in (Slovenia) Rogla
  - Parallel giant slalom winners: (Austria) Sebastian Kislinger (m) / (Russia) Milena Bykova (f)
  - Parallel slalom winners: (Austria) Benjamin Karl (m) / (Austria) Sabine Schöffmann (f)
- April 1 & 2: EC #29 in (Slovakia) Jasná
  - Event cancelled.
- April 1 & 2: EC #30 in (Switzerland) Scuol
  - Parallel giant slalom winners: (Switzerland) Nevin Galmarini (m) / (Switzerland) Ladina Jenny (f)
  - Parallel slalom winners: (Italy) Maurizio Bormolini (m) / (Poland) Karolina Sztokfisz (f)
- April 8 & 9: EC #31 in (Czech Republic) Pec pod Sněžkou
  - Event cancelled.
- April 18–22: EC #32 (final) in (Switzerland) Silvaplana
  - Note: The half-pipe events here was cancelled.
  - Big Air winners: (Switzerland) Jonas Boesiger (m) / (Finland) Emmi Parkkisenniemi (f)
  - Slopestyle winners: (Switzerland) Dario Burch (m) / (Switzerland) Elena Koenz (f)

=== 2016–17 Nor-Am Cup ===
- November 29 & 30, 2016: NAC #1 in (United States) Snow King Mountain Resort
  - Cancelled
- December 16–18, 2016: NAC #2 in (United States) Buck Hill
  - Parallel slalom #1 winners: (Canada) Richard Evanoff (m) / (United States) Maggie Carrigan (f)
  - Parallel slalom #2 winners: (Canada) Arnaud Gaudet (m) / (United States) Maggie Carrigan (f)
  - Parallel slalom #3 winners: (United States) Robert Burns (m) / (United States) Maggie Carrigan (f)
- January 4–7: NAC #3 in (Canada) Le Relais
  - Men's Parallel slalom winners: (United States) Mike Trapp (#1) / (Canada) Sébastien Beaulieu (#2)
  - Women's Parallel slalom winners: (Canada) Megan Farrell (2 times)
- January 14 & 15: NAC #4 in (United States) Steamboat Springs
  - Parallel giant slalom winners: (United States) Mike Trapp (m) / (Canada) Megan Farrell (f)
  - Men's Parallel slalom winner: (Canada) Richard Evanoff (m) / (Canada) Megan Farrell (f)
- February 1–3: NAC #5 in (Canada) Mont-Tremblant, Quebec
  - Snowboardcross #1 winners: (United States) Senna Leith (m) / (United States) Katie Wilson (f)
  - Snowboardcross #2 winners: (United States) Senna Leith (m) / (Canada) Audrey McManiman (f)
- February 8–10: NAC #6 in (Canada) Craigleith Ski Club
  - Snowboardcross #1 winners: (United States) Senna Leith (m) / (Canada) Audrey McManiman (f)
  - Snowboardcross #2 winners: (United States) Senna Leith (m) / (Canada) Audrey McManiman (f)
- February 9 & 10: NAC #7 in (United States) Holiday Valley
  - Men's Parallel giant slalom winners: (United States) Justin Reiter (2 times)
  - Women's Parallel giant slalom winners: (Canada) Rebecca Letourneau-Duynstee (#1) / (United States) Maggie Carrigan (#2)
- February 10–12: NAC #8 in Canada Olympic Park
  - Halfpipe winners: (Canada) Trevor Niblett (m) / (Canada) Calynn Irwin (f)
  - Slopestyle winners: (Canada) Joshua Reeves (m) / (Canada) Marguerite Sweeney (f)
- February 13–16: NAC #9 in (Canada) Toronto Ski Club/Toronto
  - Men's Parallel giant slalom winners: (United States) Robert Burns (#1) / (United States) Michael Trapp (#2)
  - Women's Parallel giant slalom winners: (Canada) Marianne Laurin-Lalonde (#1) / (United States) Maggie Carrigan (#2)
- February 13–17: NAC #10 in (United States) Sunday River
  - Snowboardcross #1 winners: (United States) Michael Perle (m) / (United States) Colleen Healey (f)
  - Snowboardcross #2 winners: (United States) Cole Johnson (m) / (Canada) Katie Anderson (f)
- February 15 & 16: NAC #11 in (Canada) Sun Peaks Resort
  - Men's Slopestyle winners: (Canada) Carter Jarvis (m) / (Canada) Baily Mcdonald (f)
  - Women's Slopestyle winners: (United States) Kix Kamp (m) / (Canada) Marguerite Sweeney (f)
- February 20–25: NAC #12 in (United States) Ski Cooper
  - Snowboardcross #1 winners: (United States) Robert Minghini (m) / (Canada) Katie Anderson (f)
  - Snowboardcross #2 winners: (Canada) Danny Bourgeois (m) / (United States) Anna Miller (f)
- March 5–12: #13 in (Canada) Mount St. Louis Moonstone
  - Slopestyle winners: (Canada) Carter Jarvis (m) / (Canada) Baily Mcdonald (f)
- March 8–10: #14 in (Canada) Big White Ski Resort
  - Snowboardcross #1 winners: (United States) Robert Minghini (m) / (United States) Colleen Healey (f)
  - Snowboardcross #2 winners: (Australia) Adam Dickson (m) / (Canada) Katie Anderson (f)
- March 31 – April 4: #15 in (United States) Copper Mountain
  - Snowboardcross winners: (United States) Jake Vedder (m) / (United States) Colleen Healey (f)
  - Parallel giant slalom winners: (Canada) Darren Gardner (m) / (Austria) Ina Meschik (f)
  - Parallel slalom winners: (United States) Aaron Muss (m) / (Austria) Ina Meschik (f)
- April 4–9: #16 (final) in (Canada) Mont-Tremblant
  - Snowboardcross winners: (Canada) Christopher Robanske (m) / (Canada) Audrey McManiman (f)
  - Parallel slalom winners: (United States) Robert Burns (m) / (South Korea) SHIN Da-hae (f)

=== 2016 FIS Snowboard Australia/New Zealand Cup ===
- August 4–7: SBANC #1 in (Australia) Mount Hotham #1
  - Men's Snowboardcross winner: (Australia) Alex Pullin
  - Women's Snowboardcross winner: (Australia) Belle Brockhoff
- August 15–18: SBANC #2 in (Australia) Thredbo
  - Cancelled due to insufficient snow at the snow control.
- August 30 – September 2: SBANC #3 in (Australia) Mount Hotham #2
  - Snowboardcross #1 winners: (Australia) Josh Miller (m) / (Australia) Belle Brockhoff (f)
  - Snowboardcross #2 winners: (Australia) Alex Pullin (m) / (Australia) Belle Brockhoff (f)
- September 13–16: SBANC #4 (final) in (New Zealand) Cardrona
  - Slopestyle winners: (Canada) Sebastien Toutant (m) / (New Zealand) Zoi Sadowski-Synnott (f)
  - Halfpipe winners: (Japan) Ando Naito (m) / (Japan) Kurumi Imai (f)

=== 2016 FIS Snowboard South American Cup ===
- August 17–21: SBSAC #1 in (Argentina) Cerro Catedral #1
  - Snowboardcross winners 1: (Argentina) Steven Williams (m) / (United States) Colleen Healey (f)
  - Snowboardcross winners 2: (Argentina) Simon White (m) / (United States) Colleen Healey (f)
- August 26 & 27: SBSAC #2 in (Chile) El Colorado
  - Big Air #1 winners: (Argentina) Federico Chiaradio (m) / (Chile) Antonia Yáñez (f)
  - Big Air #2 winners: (Argentina) Iñaki Odriozola (m) / (Russia) Elena Kostenko (f)
- September 9–11: SBSAC #3 in (Argentina) Cerro Catedral #2
  - Slopestyle #1 winners: (United States) Grant Giller (m) / (Russia) Elena Kostenko (f)
  - Slopestyle #2 winners: (Argentina) Martín Jaureguialzo (m) / (Russia) Elena Kostenko (f)
- September 22–26: SBSAC #4 (final) in (Chile) Corralco
  - Snowboardcross winners 1: (Argentina) Steven Williams (m) / (Brazil) Isabel Clark Ribeiro
  - Snowboardcross winners 2: (Argentina) Steven Williams (m) / (Brazil) Isabel Clark Ribeiro

== Telemark skiing ==
=== Telemark skiing world events ===
- March 1–4: 2017 FIS Telemark Junior World Championships in (Norway) Rjukan
  - Classic winners: (France) Guillaume Issautier (m) / (Germany) Kathrin Reischmann (f)
  - Sprint winners: (Norway) Kristian Lauvik Gjelstad (m) / (France) Chloe Blyth (f)
  - Parallel Sprint winners: (France) Matti Lopez (m) / (Germany) Kathrin Reischmann (f)
  - Team Parallel Sprint winners: France

=== 2016–17 FIS Telemark World Cup ===
- November 24–27, 2016: TSWC #1 in (Austria) Tux
  - Sprint #1 winners: (France) Philippe Lau (m) / (Switzerland) Amélie Reymond (f)
  - Sprint #2 winners: (Germany) Tobias Mueller (m) / (Switzerland) Amélie Reymond (f)
  - Parallel Sprint winners: (Germany) Jonas Schmid (m) / (Switzerland) Amélie Reymond (f)
- January 19 & 20: TSWC #2 in (Italy) La Thuile
  - Sprint winners: (France) Philippe Lau (m) / (Switzerland) Amélie Reymond (f)
  - Classic winners: (Switzerland) Bastien Dayer (m) / (Switzerland) Amélie Reymond (f)
- January 21 & 22: TSWC #3 in (France) Méribel
  - Sprint winners: (France) Philippe Lau (m) / (Switzerland) Amélie Reymond (f)
  - Parallel Sprint winners: (Germany) Tobias Mueller (m) / (Switzerland) Amélie Reymond (f)
- January 28–30: TSWC #4 in (Slovenia) Krvavec Ski Resort
  - Sprint winners: (Switzerland) Nicolas Michel (m) (Switzerland) Amélie Reymond (f)
  - Parallel Sprint winners: (Switzerland) Stefan Matter (m) / (Switzerland) Amélie Reymond (f)
  - Mixed Team Parallel Sprint winners: Switzerland
- February 4 & 5: TSWC #5 in (Germany) Bad Hindelang/Oberjoch
  - Parallel Sprint #1 winners: (Germany) Tobias Mueller (m) / (Switzerland) Amélie Reymond (f)
  - Parallel Sprint #2 winners: (Germany) Jonas Schmid (m) / (Switzerland) Amélie Reymond (f)
- February 24–26: TSWC #6 in (Norway) Hurdal
  - Classic winners: (Norway) Trym Nygaard Løken (m) / (Switzerland) Amélie Reymond (f)
  - Parallel Sprint winners: (Norway) Trym Nygaard Løken (m) / (Switzerland) Amélie Reymond (f)
  - Sprint winners: (Germany) Tobias Mueller (m) / (Switzerland) Amélie Reymond (f)
- March 1–3: TSWC #7 in (Norway) Rjukan (part of FIS Telemark Junior World Championships)
  - Classic winners: (Germany) Tobias Mueller (m) / (Switzerland) Amélie Reymond (f)
  - Sprint winners: (Germany) Tobias Mueller (m) / (Switzerland) Amélie Reymond (f)
  - Parallel Sprint winners: (Germany) Tobias Mueller (m) / (Switzerland) Amélie Reymond (f)
- March 9–11: TSWC #8 in (Switzerland) Thyon
  - Classic winners: (Switzerland) Bastien Dayer (m) / (Switzerland) Amélie Reymond (f)
  - Parallel Sprint winners: (Norway) Trym Nygaard Løken (m) / (Switzerland) Amélie Reymond (f)
  - Sprint winners: (Germany) Tobias Mueller (m) / (Switzerland) Amélie Reymond (f)
- March 15–19: TSWC #9 (final) in (France) La Plagne/Montchavin-les-Coches (part of 2017 FIS World Telemark Skiing Championships)
  - Team Parallel Sprint winners: Switzerland
  - Parallel Sprint winners: (France) Philippe Lau (m) / (Switzerland) Amélie Reymond (f)
  - Classic winners: (Switzerland) Stefan Matter (m) / (Switzerland) Amélie Reymond (f)
  - Sprint winners: (Germany) Tobias Mueller (m) / (Switzerland) Amélie Reymond (f)
