= Matthew Gelso =

American cross-country skier (born 1988)

Personal information
- Full name: Matthew Phillip Gelso
- Born: July 18, 1988 (age 38) Truckee, California

Sport
- Sport: Skiing
- Club: Sun Valley Ski Education Fnd

World Cup career
- Seasons: -

Matthew Phillip Gelso (born July 18, 1988) is an American cross-country skier. He was born in Truckee, California.

He represented US at the FIS Nordic World Ski Championships 2015 in Falun.
