= Yury Astapenka =

Belarusian cross-country skier (born 1990)

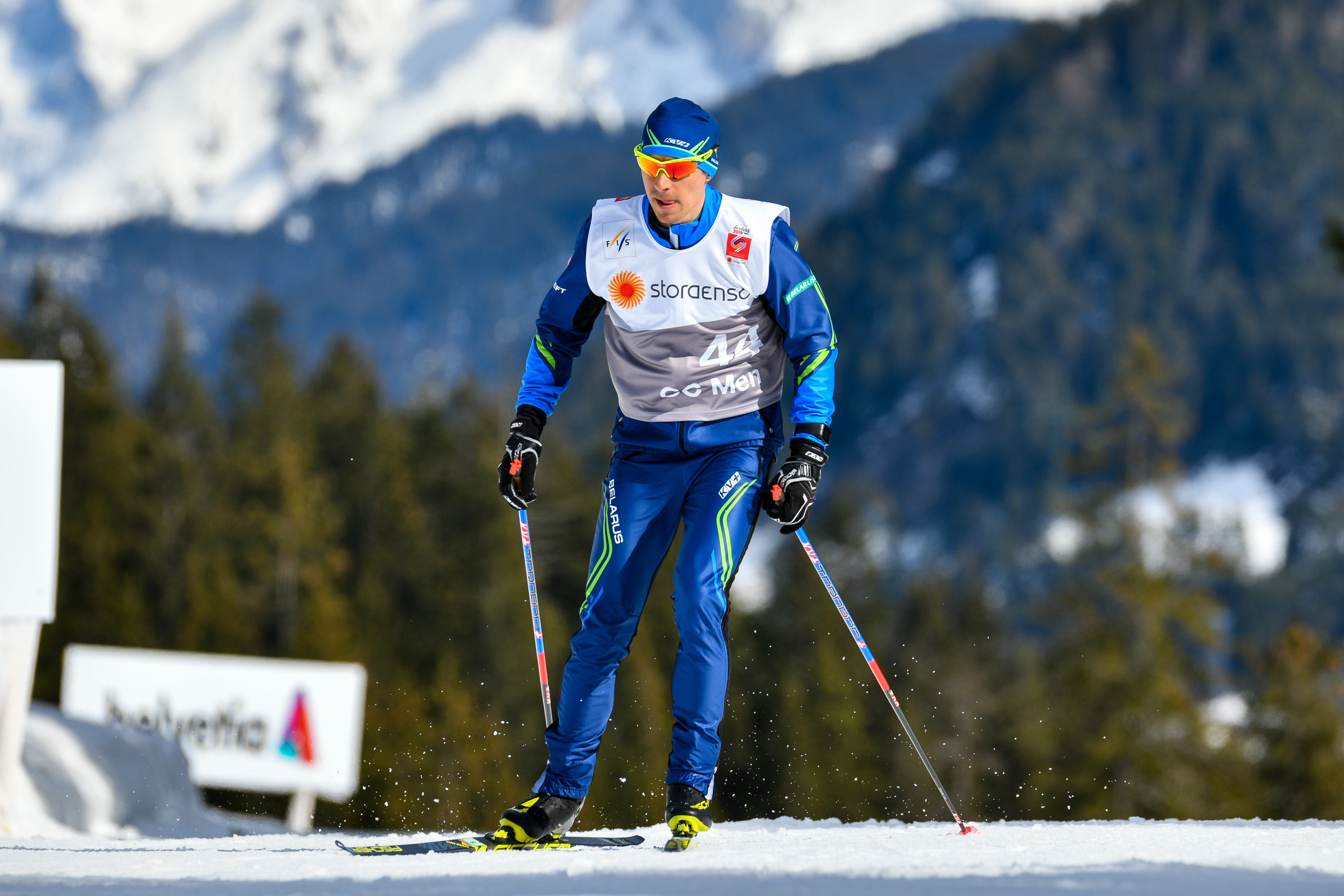

Personal information
- Born: 10 October 1990 (age 35)

Sport
- Sport: Skiing

World Cup career
- Seasons: -
Medal record
Men's cross-country skiing
Representing Belarus

Yury Astapenka (Belarusian: Юры Астапенка; born 10 October 1990) is a Belarusian cross-country skier.

He represented Belarus at the FIS Nordic World Ski Championships 2015 in Falun.
