= Blue Mountain (British Columbia) =

Mountain in British Columbia, Canada

Coordinates: 49°16′14″N 122°28′22″W

Blue Mountain is a mountain in British Columbia.
