= Marc Digruber =

Austrian alpine skier

Personal information
- Born: 29 April 1988 (age 38)

Skiing career
- Sport: Alpine skiing ♂
- Club: Sportunion Mitterbach - Niederoes
- Disciplines: Slalom, giant slalom
World Cup debut
14 November 2010 (age 22)

World Championships
- Teams: 0
- Medals: 0

World Cup
- Seasons: 8 – (2011–18)
- Wins: 0
- Podiums: 0
- Overall titles: 0 – (55th in 2016)
- Discipline titles: 0 – (16th in SL, 2016)

Marc Digruber (born 29 April 1988) is an Austrian alpine ski racer. Digruber specializes in the technical events of Slalom and Giant slalom. He made his Alpine Skiing World Cup debut in the Levi slalom on 14 November 2010.

He lives in Frankenfels, Lower Austria.

== World Cup results ==
Season	Age	Overall	Slalom	Giant slalom	Super-G	Downhill	Combined
2011	22	124	54	—	—	—	38
2012	23	123	47	—	—	—	45
2014	25	117	42	—	—	—	—
2016	27	55	16	—	—	—	—
2017	28	69	25	—	—	—	—
2018	29	65	27	—	—	—	—

- Standings through 28 January 2018
