= Harvey Sproule =

Canadian hockey player and coach

Frederick Harvey Sproule
- Born: January 12, 1883; New Tecumseth, Ontario, Canada
- Died: July 9, 1959 (aged 76)
- Occupations: NHL owner, coach, referee, journalist

F. Harvey Sproule (January 12, 1883 – July 9, 1959) was a Canadian hockey player, National Hockey League coach, owner, executive, and referee, as well as a curler, journalist, and race horse owner.

== Early years ==
From Milton, Ontario, where he attended school, Sproule was a competitive cyclist and played amateur hockey in his hometown. Records show Sproule lived with his Uncle John Head and his wife Mary Elizabeth Sproule in Milton as young as age 8 in 1891.

Sproule's uncle, John Head, had been a Milton town councillor, and a business merchant in Milton since at least 1881, selling men's and women's clothing, before getting a customs job in Toronto and moving there with the family in the mid-1890s. In 1901, Sproule and his sister were still living with their Uncle John Head and his wife Mary in west Toronto. In 1905, Sproule's sister Mildred died at age 20 at their uncle's home.

While in Toronto, Sproule played for the Toronto Old Orchard and the Toronto Rowing Club hockey teams. He then became involved in team management as coach and manager of the Toronto Victorias and Toronto Crescents.

== Notable relatives ==
Sproule was related to William Kingston Flesher (June 10, 1825 – July 22, 1907), a settler of southwestern Ontario, a militia officer, businessman and political figure. As well as founding the village of Flesherton, he represented the riding of Grey East in the House of Commons of Canada as a Conservative member from 1872 to 1878.

Flesher's son-in-law was Thomas Simpson Sproule, Speaker of the House of Commons of Canada and Canadian Senator.

== Career ==
=== Referee ===
For many years, Sproule was a referee in the Ontario Hockey Association. In 1913, the Toronto Canoe Club selected Sproule to officiate the city's championship game.

On January 22, 1914, he was the referee for one of the wildest games in OUA league history in when spectators in Collingwood, Ontario, rioted, came onto the ice and threatened and assaulted Sproule. J. Ross Robertson issued a warning to Collingwood following the incident that another similar instance would result in a ban to the town and the rink.

In 1915, he was involved with a decision by the Toronto's Beaches Hockey League to grant soldiers the same privileges in the BHL as they had in the OHA at the time.

=== Horse Racing ===
Sproule was also a sports journalist, writing for the Toronto Star and other publications, usually about horse racing. In 1914, he was quoted in the Ottawa Citizen as being opposed to the installation of "iron men" betting machines at Ottawa's horse racing track, arguing that the clientele that frequented smaller locations still preferred to bet on the books.

Partnered with Paul Ciceri, Sproule owned the Coronado racing stable. Sproule's horse named Rocksilk won the first race on the programme for Canadian-bred horses at the 1920 King's Plate at Woodbine. Rocksilk was bred by the famous stud of the late Joseph E. Seagram of Waterloo, Ontario. He continued to race his horses through the 1920s in places as far as Chicago.

=== Toronto St. Patricks ===
In 1919, Sproule and Ciceri became partners in Toronto's NHL franchise, which was renamed the Toronto St. Patricks with Sproule as secretary-treasurer and business manager. During the season, Sproule became head coach of the team and held the job until the end of the 1919–20 season. In the last game of the season, which was meaningless as Toronto would not advance to the Stanley Cup Finals that year, a zealous fan presented coach Sproule with "a loving cup" during the second intermission, with Toronto beating Montreal 8-2 at that point. NHL record books list him as coaching 12 games with a record of seven wins and five losses.

=== Later years ===
Sproule became an NHL referee during the 1920–21 season and also returned to the OHA as a referee.

It seems Sproule may have gained an interest in curling early in life from his Uncle John Head. In 1928, Sproule threw third stones for the Lakeview Curling Club team under skip Charles Snow that finished in a three-way tie for first place through the round-robin at the 1928 Macdonald Brier. The team lost its tie-breaking games and finished third. Sproule went on to skip his own team for many years in Toronto and Cobourg, Ontario. He lost in the final of the Ontario British Consols in 1939 to Bert Hall.

=== Death ===
On January 17, 1945, Sproule's first wife Fannie Retallack died at age 56. Harvey remarried later to Grace Macklin, who was 18 years his junior. Harvey Sproule died on July 9, 1959. He is buried in Cobourg Union Cemetery in Cobourg, Ontario, along with his first wife Fannie and his second wife Grace.

== Coaching record ==
Team	Year	Regular season							Postseason
Team	Year	G	W	L	T	OTL	Pts	Finish	Result
TOR	1919–20	12	7	5	0	-	(24)	3rd in NHL	Did not qualify

Preceded by Frank Heffernan	Head coach of the Toronto St. Patricks; 1920	Succeeded by Frank Carroll
