= Beaver Valley (Ontario) =

Valley in southern Ontario, Canada

Coordinates: 44.4°N 80.5°W

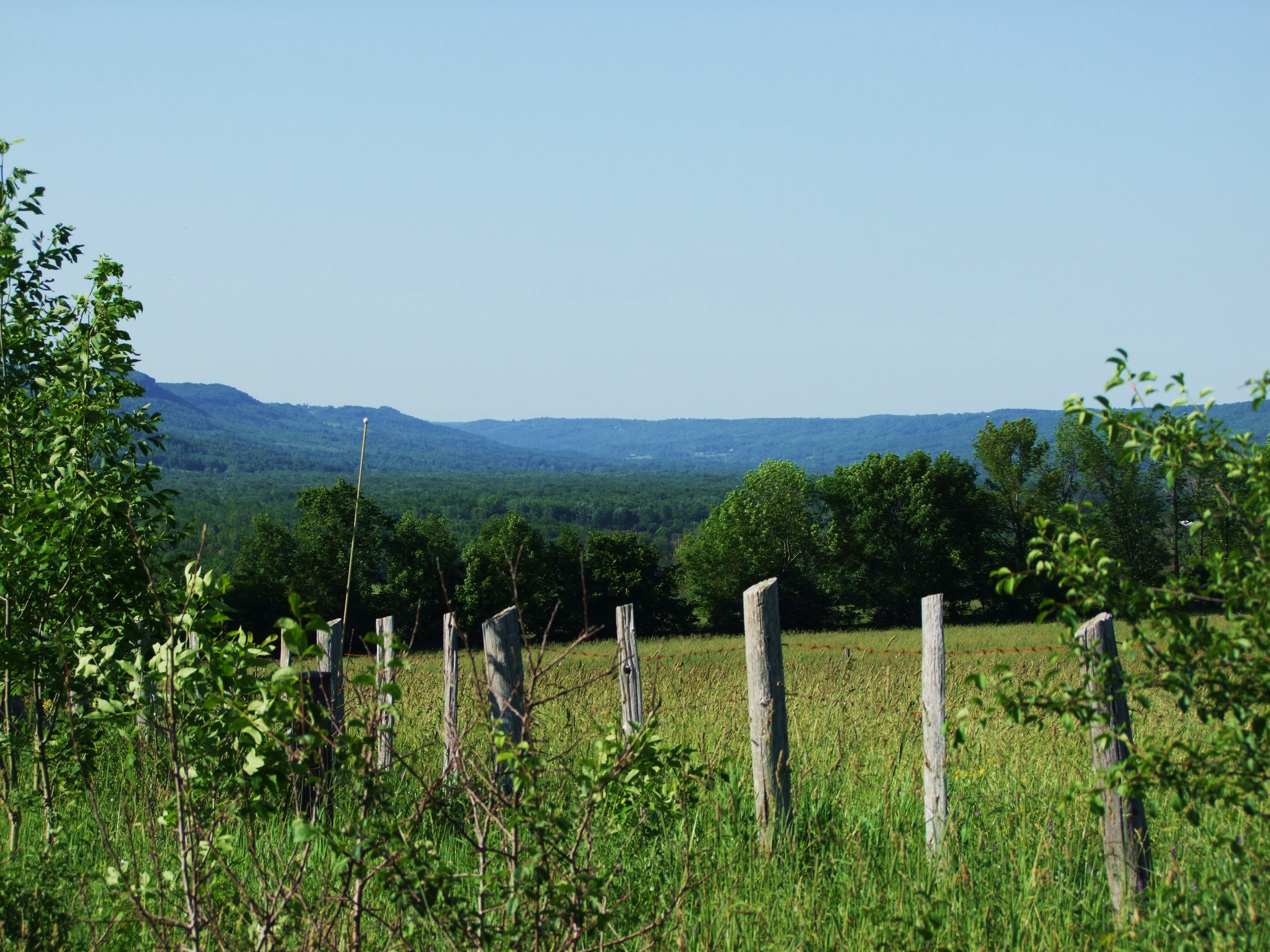
- The Beaver Valley, looking south

Geography
- Country: Canada
- Province: Ontario
- Region: Southwestern Ontario
- County: Grey
- Borders on: Niagara Escarpment; Niagara Escarpment; Georgian Bay
- River: Beaver River
- Interactive map of Beaver Valley

The Beaver Valley is a valley in southern Ontario, Canada, at the southern tip of Georgian Bay. The Beaver River flows north through the valley, emptying into Georgian Bay in the town of Thornbury. It is a productive agricultural area, producing a significant portion of Canada's apple crop. It also contains one of Ontario's best-preserved hardwood swamp ecosystems. The Bruce Trail follows the perimeter of the valley passing several natural landmarks including Old Baldy, the Duncan Crevice Caves, and Eugenia Falls. The main towns in the valley are Flesherton at the south end, Kimberley, and Thornbury.

== Geology ==
The Beaver Valley formed over a period of many thousands of years as the Beaver River cut into the Niagara Escarpment. Today, the river continues to cut southward into the bedrock at Eugenia Falls. Gradual erosive processes have created a wedge-shaped valley with a width ranging from 30 meters (90 feet) at the south end to 13 kilometers (8 miles) at the north end.

== Ecology ==
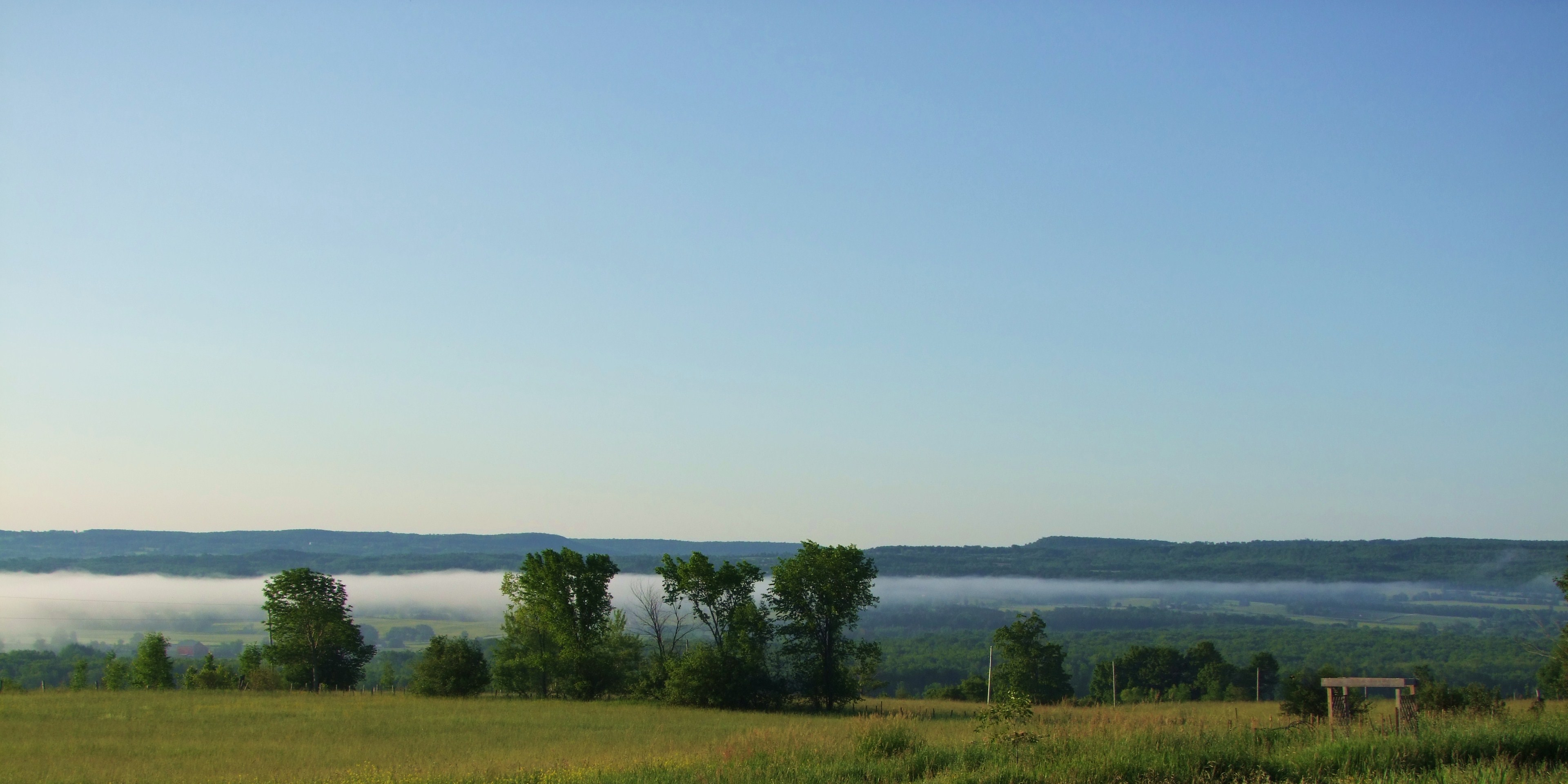
The Beaver Valley in summer, looking east. Fog drifting off Georgian Bay is not uncommon.

While much of the valley is heavily cultivated, it also contains several well-preserved natural habitats and is home to a number of locally and globally rare species, notably American Hart's-tongue fern (Asplenium scolopendrium var. americanum). The Beaver River is the largest subwatershed of the Blue Mountain Watershed. It also provides a wide range of natural habitat for flora and fauna and is a spawning ground for Rainbow Trout, Chinook Salmon, and Brown Trout.

== Recreation ==
The valley is well known for skiing and snowboarding in the winter, as well as rock climbing, mountain biking and hiking in the summer. Many canoeists and kayakers row along the Beaver River. Beaver Valley Ski Club operates as a private ski club just south of the town of Kimberley. A location known as Old Smokey was a ski area in the valley that closed in the early 1980s. Another resort, Talisman, was opened in 1963 and closed in 2011, approximately 4 million dollars in debt. When the resort was operating, it included a 9-hole golf course and a ski hill with 3 chairlifts and a T-bar.

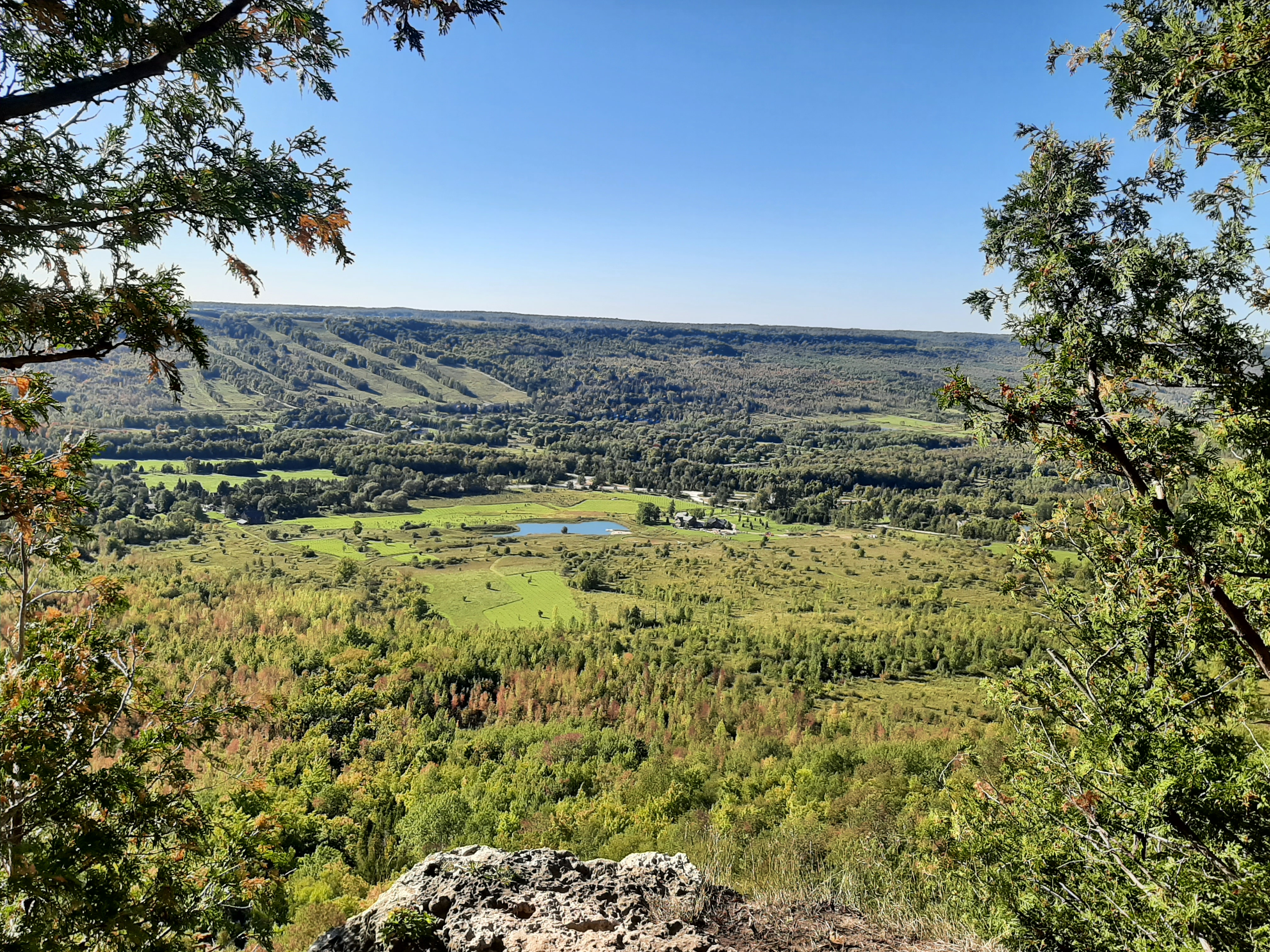
View of the Beaver Valley from the Lookout of Old Baldy Conservation Area
