= Beaver River (Grey County) =

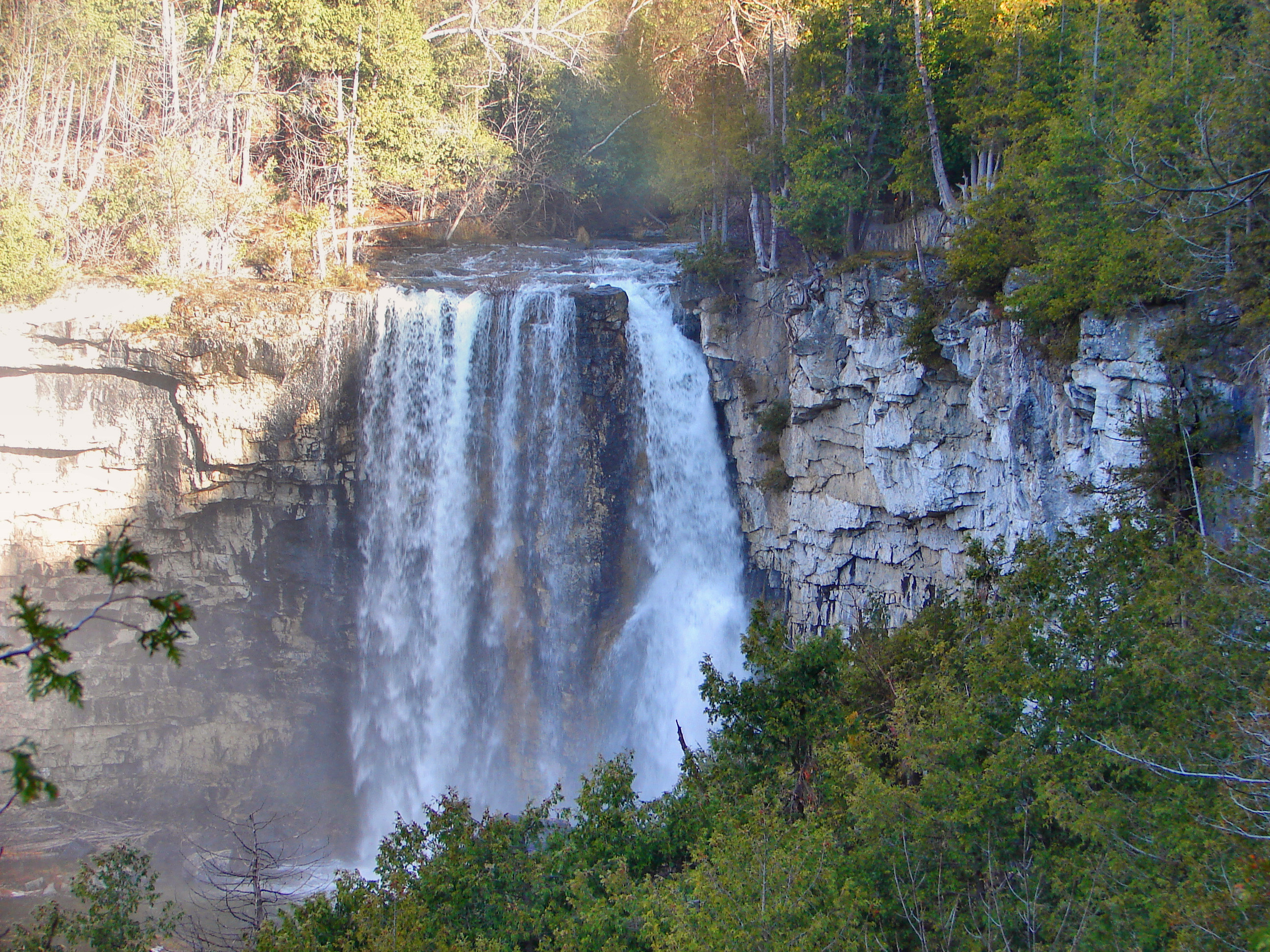
- The Beaver River passing over the Eugenia Falls

- Location of the mouth of the Beaver River in southern Ontario

Location
- Country: Canada
- Province: Ontario
- Region: Southern Ontario
- Counties: Grey; Simcoe

Physical characteristics
- Source: field
  - location: Clearview, Simcoe County
  - coordinates: 44°23′29″N 80°15′27″W
  - elevation: 513 m (1,683 ft)
- Mouth: Georgian Bay on Lake Huron
  - location: The Blue Mountains, Grey County
  - coordinates: 44°33′54″N 80°26′52″W
  - elevation: 176 m (577 ft)

Basin features
- River system: Great Lakes Basin
- Tributaries
  - left: Boyne River, Little Beaver River

The Beaver River is a river in Grey County and Simcoe County in Southern Ontario, Canada. It is part of the Great Lakes Basin, and is a tributary of Lake Huron. The river's drainage basin is under the auspices of Grey Sauble Conservation.

== Course ==
The river begins in a field in Clearview, Simcoe County, and flows west immediately into Grey Highlands, Grey County. The river continues southwest, takes in the left tributary Little Beaver River, and heads into Eugenia Lake at the edge of the Niagara Escarpment at the community of Eugenia; the lake was formed when the river was regulated for flow control and a hydroelectric plant was built. It continues over the Eugenia Falls and takes in the left tributary Boyne River, and turns north, flowing through Beaver Valley into the municipality of The Blue Mountains. The river then heads north, passes over two dams and reaches its mouth at Nottawasaga Bay on Georgian Bay, Lake Huron, at the community of Thornbury.

== Natural history ==
A fish ladder near Thornbury allows fish to reach spawning areas up river.

== Recreation ==
The river is also a popular recreational canoe route. The Beaver Valley is home to the Beaver Valley Ski Club.

== Tributaries ==
- Grier Creek (left)
- Mill Creek (right)
- Bill's Creek (left)
- Wodehouse Creek (left)
- Boyne River (left)
- Black's Creek (right)
- Little Beaver River (left)

== Sources ==
- Map 4 (PDF) (Map). 1 : 700,000. Official road map of Ontario. Ministry of Transportation of Ontario. 2010-01-01.
- Restructured municipalities - Ontario map #6 (Map). Restructuring Maps of Ontario. Ontario Ministry of Municipal Affairs and Housing. 2006. Archived from the original on 2021-02-24.

== See also ==
- Beaver Valley (Ontario)
- List of rivers of Ontario
- Beaver Valley Ski Club
