= Boyne River (Grey County) =

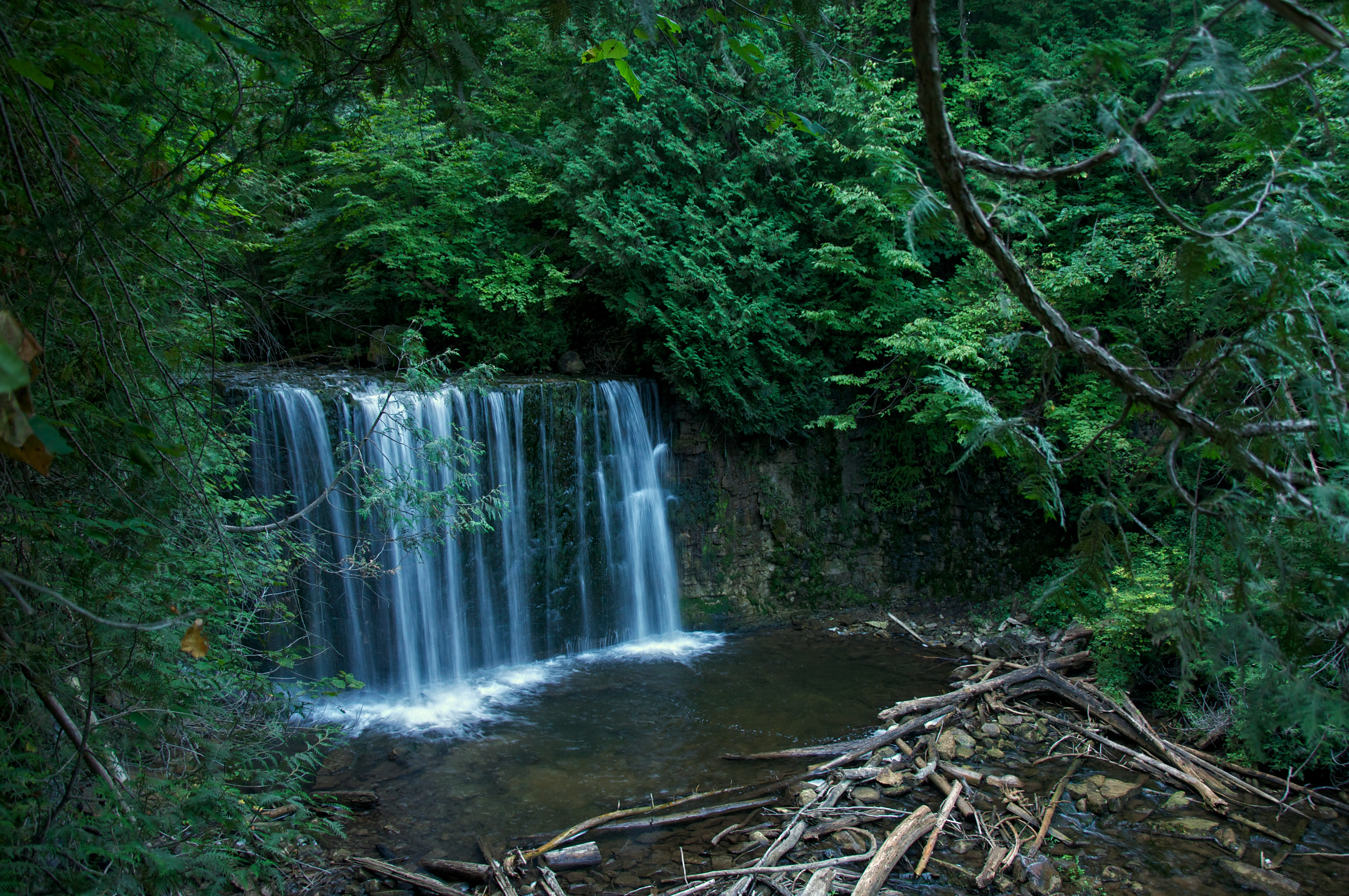
- The river passing over Hoggs Falls

- Location of the mouth of the Boyne River in southern Ontario

Location
- Country: Canada
- Province: Ontario
- Region: Southwestern Ontario
- County: Grey
- Municipality: Grey Highlands

Physical characteristics
- Source: Wilcox Lake
  - coordinates: 44°13′52″N 80°33′30″W
  - elevation: 469 m (1,539 ft)
- Mouth: Beaver River
  - coordinates: 44°18′53″N 80°32′22″W
  - elevation: 295 m (968 ft)

Basin features
- River system: Great Lakes Basin
- Tributaries
  - right: Flesherton Creek

The Boyne River is a river in the municipality of Grey Highlands, Grey County in Southwestern Ontario, Canada. It is part of the Great Lakes Basin, and lies entirely within geographic Artemesia Township.

== Course ==
The river begins at Wilcox Lake and flows north under the Toronto, Grey and Bruce Railway line. It passes through Flesherton Community Pond at the community of Flesherton, then exits the pond over a weir and passes under Ontario Highway 10. It continues north and starts to descend the Niagara Escarpment by passing over the Hoggs Falls, named after William Hogg, takes in the right tributary Flesherton Creek, and continues downhill to its mouth at the Beaver River west of the community of Eugenia. The Beaver River flows to Georgian Bay on Lake Huron.

== Tributaries ==
- Flesherton Creek (right)

== Sources ==
- Map 4 (PDF) (Map). 1 : 700,000. Official road map of Ontario. Ministry of Transportation of Ontario. 2010-01-01.
- Restructured municipalities - Ontario map #6 (Map). Restructuring Maps of Ontario. Ontario Ministry of Municipal Affairs and Housing. 2006. Archived from the original on 2021-02-24.
