= Grey East =

Grey East may refer to:

- Grey East (federal electoral district)
- Grey East (provincial electoral district)
