= William Kingston Flesher =

Canadian politician

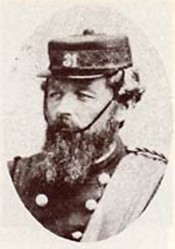
W.K. Flesher in captain's militia uniform, circa 1866

William Kingston Flesher (June 10, 1825 – July 22, 1907) was a settler of southwestern Ontario, a militia officer, businessman and political figure. As well as founding the village of Flesherton, he represented the riding of Grey East in the House of Commons of Canada as a Conservative member from 1872 to 1878.

== Early life ==
Flesher was born in Kingston-upon-Hull, England in 1825, the eldest child of Rev. John Flesher, a Methodist preacher and Jane (née Cawood) Flesher. He was educated and spent his formative years in England. After he married Jane Foster in 1847 at the age of 22, they emigrated to Canada West.

== Settler ==
Flesher first moved to Bolton, Ontario, where he helped to run a mill with his brother John. However, Flesher sensed that he would never make his fortune as an employee, and cast about for a better opportunity. The colonial government was granting 50-acre plots of land to settlers on the understanding that if the settler was able to clear twelve of the fifty acres within five years, the settler would be given free title to the entire plot. Flesher travelled north to the newly surveyed Artemesia Township in Grey County, and was settled on 50 acres of land at Artemesia Corners, the intersection of the Toronto-Syndenham and Durham Roads (later provincial Highways 10 & 4). He was only the second settler in the area, the first being Aaron Munshaw Jr., a former Reformer who had recently returned from exile after the failed Upper Canada Rebellion. Munshaw had been granted land on the east side of the Toronto-Sydenham Road straddling the Durham Road, and had built a small tavern at the intersection. Flesher's land grant was on the opposite side of the road.

Both men laid out the parts of their land grants as village plots, and sold them to tradesmen and others eager to move to the area. Flesher also built a saw mill and a grist mill on the nearby Boyne River, and eventually built a large house for his family.

As the area was settled, Flesher continued to be a prominent local figure, acting at various times as postmaster (1865–1867 and 1869–1872), magistrate, druggist, and even doctor. He was a vocal booster of the village, and convinced other businesses to settle in the area, and also organized a Masonic Lodge. In recognition of his contributions, the name of the settlement was changed to Flesher's Corners. In 1866, in response to the Fenian Raids, Flesher became captain of the local militia, No. 6 Company of the 31st Grey Regiment. In 1867, the settlement had grown to the point where a more "village-like" name was seen as desirable, and the name was changed to Flesherton. Flesher was also involved in local construction, and in 1868, for $565, was awarded the contract to rebuild Osprey School Section No. 9, a one-room school that had burned down the previous year.

In 1876, Flesher donated some of his land for construction of a permanent Methodist church. The red brick church was finished a year later, and dedicated on 18 November 1877 by Minister of Education Egerton Ryerson.

== Politician ==
Flesher served as Warden of Grey County (1855–1857, 1861–1862, 1865 and 1867), and Reeve of the village (1854–1865 and 1866–1878). In 1867, he ran unsuccessfully for a seat in the provincial legislature, but in 1872, as a Conservative, he was elected to the House of Commons as the first MP for the new riding of Grey East. He served in John A. Macdonald's Opposition, and was re-elected in 1874 before retiring in 1878 to make way for Thomas Simpson Sproule, the man who would marry his daughter Mary Alice in 1881.<refMorgan, Henry J., ed. (1873). The Canadian Parliamentary Companion (Eighth ed.). Montreal Printing and Publishing Company. p. 172.</ref>

== Family ==
Flesher and his wife Jane raised five children:

- Jane, born 1850, married and became Mrs. W. Ansley.
- John ("Jack"), born 1852, moved to Parry Sound, Ontario with his wife Mary Anne and seven children. In 1902, when his employer sent him to New Zealand to supervise the construction of New Zealand's first saw mill, his wife Mary Anne and his children remained behind in Canada. Two years later, Jack received word that his wife had died, and he subsequently never returned to Canada. He married a Maori woman, Tare Doris Wikaira, and raised another three children in New Zealand.
- Mary Alice, born 1854, married Thomas Simpson Sproule, a local businessman from nearby Markdale who had succeeded William Flesher as the local MP in 1878 and subsequently served eight consecutive terms, eventually becoming Speaker of the House of Commons from 1911 to 1915, and a member of the Senate from 1915 until his death in 1917. T.S. Sproule's niece was Elizabeth Sproule, who together with her husband John Head, cared for her young nephew, and later NHL owner, Harvey Sproule and his sister.
- William Henry, born 1856, also stayed in the area and worked as a businessman and artist, but died at the relatively young age of 42 in 1898.
- an adopted daughter Ida

Several other young Fleshers lived in the area, including Thomas, William and Jack. Although some assumed that these were W.K. Flesher's nephews or cousins, a popular local rumour of the time — fuelled by his many trips back to his native England — held that he actually had a second wife living in England, and these other Fleshers were actually his children.

Flesher's younger brother John lived in the Flesherton area for several years before moving to Orangeville, Ontario, where he served as the district's MPP in the Ontario legislative assembly for 4 years.

== Death ==
Flesher travelled back to England frequently — his wife's obituary says he returned more than 35 times. During one such visit in 1907, he died at the age of 82 in Carnarvon, Wales.

Flesher's wife Jane survived him by 4 years, dying in 1911. She was buried in Flesherton Cemetery beside her son William Henry. Although descendants of her daughters continued to live in the area, her older son John and his family had moved away from the area, and while her younger son William Henry's family was present for the 1901 census, none were present for the 1911 census making Jane the last Flesher to live in Flesherton.

== Electoral record ==
1872 Canadian federal election: Grey East
Party	Candidate	Votes
Conservative	William Kingston Flesher	1,402
Unknown	R. McKnight	857
Source: Canadian Elections Database

1874 Canadian federal election: Grey East
Party	Candidate	Votes
Conservative	William Kingston Flesher	1,566
Unknown	R. McKnight	1,121

Parliament of Canada
Preceded by Electoral District was created in 1872	Member of Parliament from Grey East; 1872–1878	Succeeded by Thomas Simpson Sproule
