= Grey Highlands Secondary School =

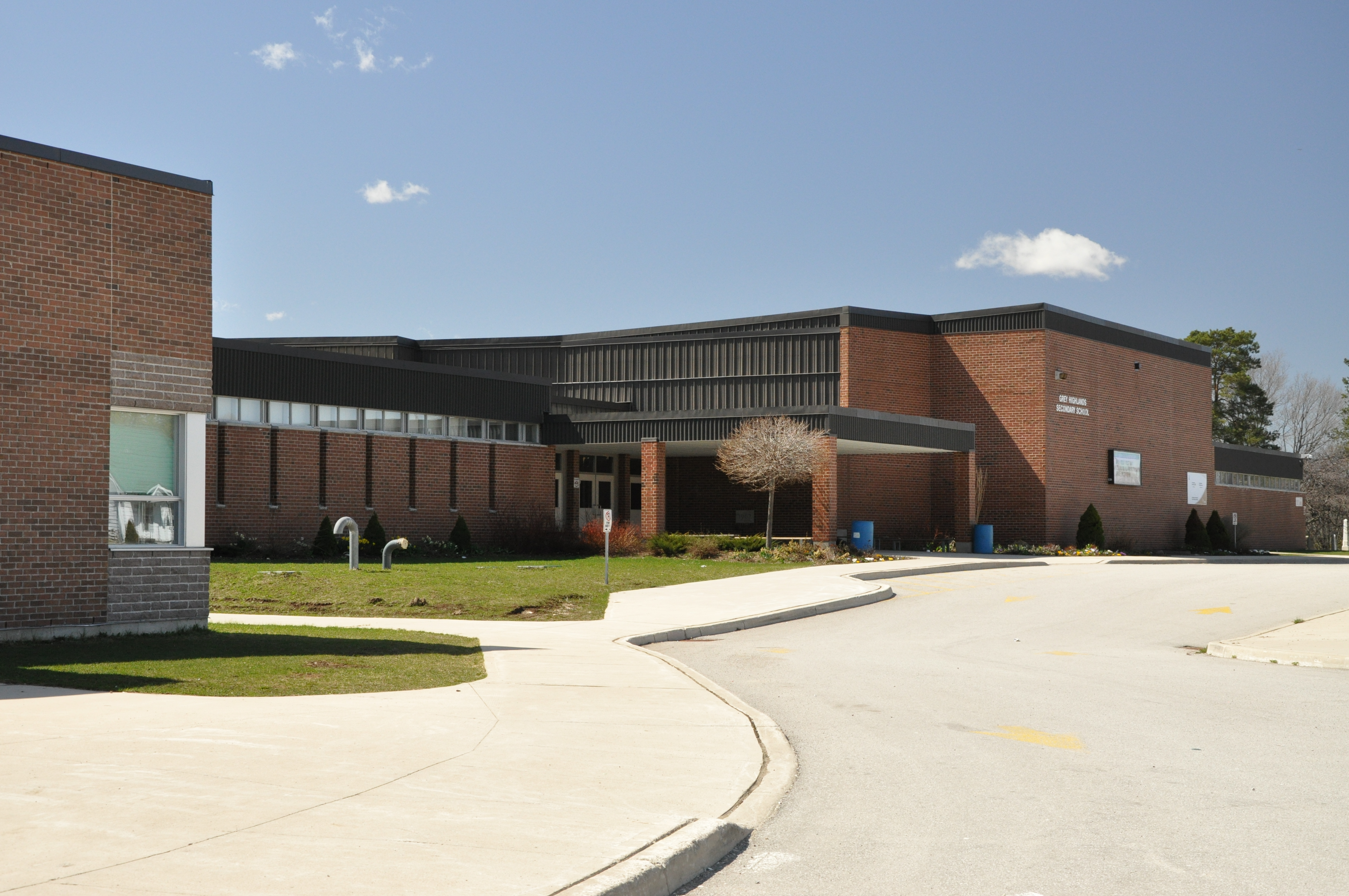

Location
- 100 Highway 10; Flesherton, Ontario, N0C 1E0; Canada; 44.25673°N 80.54375°W

Information
- School type: Coeducational secondary
- Founded: 1968
- School board: Bluewater District School Board
- Principal: Erin Paylor
- Grades: 9–12
- Enrollment: 670 (2020)
- Language: English
- Website: www.ghss.bwdsb.on.ca

Grey Highlands Secondary School is a Grade 9–12 high school located in 100 Highway 10, Flesherton, Ontario, Canada, in rural Grey County. It was built in 1967.

== Early history ==
Murray Juffs at construction site, 1967

Grey Highlands Secondary School (GHSS) was built in 1967 as one of the many new school construction projects undertaken by Education Minister, Bill Davis, in order to modernize and centralize rural elementary and secondary schools. When it opened in September 1968, it became the central high school for students from three smaller district high schools, covering a collection area of 195,000 hectares (750 square miles). Those smaller high schools were converted to elementary schools, which in turn replaced the many one- and two-room school houses that were still in operation until that time.

Until that time, the curriculum and facilities in Ontario's rural high schools were designed solely for academic students destined for post-secondary education. Students needing a level of education necessary for the trades, business or a non-academic career inevitably dropped out of high school.

E. Murray Juffs, the first principal of Grey Highlands and the main driving force behind the design of the school, envisioned Grey Highlands as a multi-discipline school, encompassing opportunities for education in all streams, from occupational training as a car mechanic or short-order cook, to business office training, to a liberal arts education suitable for university preparation.

== Incidents ==
The area around Flesherton is in a snow belt region, and winter storms from Lake Huron and Georgian Bay can cause several "snow days" each year, when buses cannot safely deliver students. While this is not a problem when students are forced to stay home, there is always the question of whether to send students home early when a daytime storm threatens. This problem was not anticipated in the first winter of operation (1968–69), when a sudden storm stranded the entire student body and staff at the school, forcing them to spend the night in the gymnasium and auditorium. Procedures were developed to try to avoid this, including a barograph in the office of the then Head of Science, W.J. Brown, that would warn of sudden drops in barometric pressure. Despite this, there was another forced sleepover twenty years later, on February 8, 1989, when 130 students had to stay at the school overnight due to an unexpected storm.

== Notable alumni ==
- Matt Galloway (graduated 1989), CBC radio personality
- Chris Neil (graduated 1996), NHL hockey player
- Oliver Schroer (graduated 1974), award-winning fiddler and recording artist

== See also ==
- Education in Ontario
- List of secondary schools in Ontario
