= Lake Eugenia =

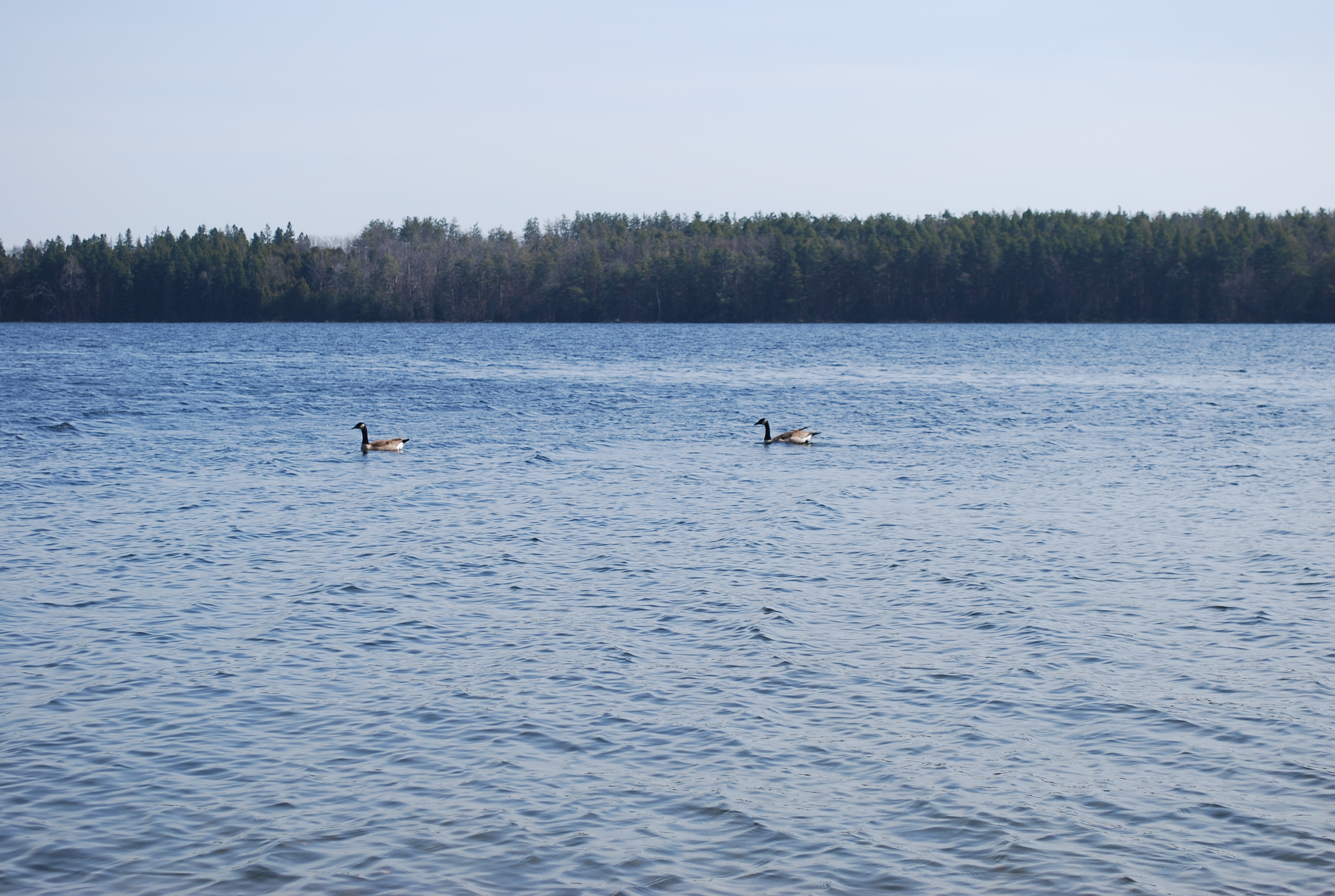
- Lake Eugenia in the early spring as the Canada geese return

- Location within Ontario
- Location: Eugenia, Ontario
- Coordinates: 44°19′36″N 80°29′53″W
- Type: Artificial lake
- Primary inflows: Beaver River
- Primary outflows: Beaver River
- Basin countries: Canada
- Islands: 1 large one, several minuscule ones
- Settlements: Eugenia

Lake Eugenia is an artificial lake in Grey County, Ontario, Canada.

== History and geography ==
The lake was man-made in the early 1900s as a reservoir for a hydro-electric dam on the Beaver River built in 1912. In 1913, the Hydro Electric Power Commission of Ontario bought 1,900 acres (7,700,000 m^{2}) of land from farmers. This land was then cleared and flooded. After being flooded, the edge of the water was full of twists and turns with bay and inlets. Beginning in the 1950s, the lake became very popular amongst locals as a get-away.

== Fishing ==
Eugenia Lake attracts recreational fishers both local to the region and those visiting due to the range of fish in the lake. The main species of fish that can be caught in the lake include Rock, Smallmouth and Largemouth Bass, Perch, Sunfish, and Bullhead catfish.

== See also ==
- Eugenia, Ontario
