= Oliver Schroer =

Canadian violinist, composer, and producer (1956–2008)

- Born: June 18, 1956
- Origin: Canada
- Died: July 3, 2008 (aged 52)
- Occupations: Musician; composer; music producer
- Instrument: Violin
- Years active: 1993–2008
- Website: oliverschroer.com

Oliver Schroer (June 18, 1956 – July 3, 2008) was a Canadian fiddler, composer, and music producer.

== Early life ==
Oliver Schroer grew up in Vandeleur, Ontario, a small farming community near Markdale in rural Grey County. He attended Grey Highlands Secondary School in Flesherton, where he played French horn in the school band. He also took private violin lessons. He graduated in 1974, having earned several academic awards.

Schroer was dissatisfied with university life, and began to busk in Toronto, playing guitar in the Toronto subway. After several years, he picked up his violin again, but to play fiddle rather than classical music. Eventually, he began to record, and in 1993 released his first album, Jigzup, which was nominated for a Juno Award in the Best Roots or Traditional Album category.

== Recording career ==
Schroer was a prolific composer, recording ten CDs in 14 years. He performed in Europe and North America in clubs, cathedrals, and New York's Lincoln Center. Altogether, he produced or performed on over 100 albums, and wrote more than 1,000 pieces of music. He recorded with artists such as Jimmy Webb and Barry Mann, Canadian singers James Keelaghan, Loreena McKennitt and Sylvia Tyson, acoustic guitar artists Jesse Cook and Don Ross, and Canadian rock bands Great Big Sea and Spirit of the West.

Toronto critic Robert Everett-Green described his style as a "fusion of Ontario fiddling traditions with the kind of architectural, string-crossing music of Bach's solo violin works." Schroer's music also frequently employs violin harmonic and double stop techniques to create distinctly modern sounds.

Schroer taught music and mentored extensively in Gibsons on the Sunshine Coast, and Smithers, British Columbia, in Northern British Columbia during the last seven years of his life. He wrote a piece of music for each of his 59 young students in Smithers, and recorded each with Emilyn Stam, a young pianist from Smithers. His album Smithers is a thank-you album dedicated to the town.

During his time as a music educator, Schroer established a series of groups of young fiddlers and other musicians that he called The Twisted String. Schroer composed large orchestral arrangements for these groups and performed with them at Music festivals throughout Canada.

His album Camino was recorded in churches along the Camino de Santiago pilgrim trail. Schroer walked 1,000 km of the trail in 2004 with his wife and two friends, carrying portable recording equipment. To save weight, he did not bring a violin case. He carried his instrument wrapped in a sleeping bag in his backpack, "like my own precious relic, carefully packed in its reliquary of socks and underwear." The album features solo playing, occasionally against a background of local sounds such as church bells, birds, and monastic voices.

In 2007, Schroer was diagnosed with leukemia, which proved to be untreatable. A tribute concert for Schroer was held on February 28 & 19, 2008 at Hugh's Room in Toronto. It was MCed by CBC's Stuart McLean and Shelagh Rogers and featured the likes of James Keelaghan, Jessie Cook, Garnet Rogers, and among many others, his Twisted String Project, seventeen youth, aged 9 through 18, led by two of Oliver's proteges, Chelsea Sleep and Emilyn Stam, who traveled from British Columbia to take part in the concerts. The entire trip was funded through public donations of money and airmiles. The fundraising effort was broadcast on CBC radio, and unbeknownst by Oliver who was confined in the hospital, the group's visit remained a secret to Schroer until just days before the concert. CBC Radio 2 recorded the concert, which aired on Canada Live on April 7, 2008.

Schroer's last concert was performed on June 5, 2008. In a letter to his fans on April 30, when he first announced his intention to do this concert, he called it "Oliver's Last Concert on his Tour of this Planet". He asked that his sold-out audience clap, not cry, and apologized for not being his normal glad-handing self; the risk of infection from personal contact would have been much too great. A subsequent review in The Globe and Mail called Schroer "an investigative fiddler". Schroer was guested at the concert by long-time friends, musical collaborators and students; David Woodhead, Ansgar Schroer, Jaron Freeman-Fox, Emilyn Stam and Chelsea Sleep. Schroer died just shy of one month later.

During his final stages of his illness, Schroer said of his compositions, "I used to write a lot of jigs, reels and waltzes – as a matter of fact I still do. But over the years new kinds of melodies emerged – more rarefied, harder to pin down. There were prayers, incantations, whimsies, melismas, mysteriosos, heisenbergs, fractal reels, forest blues, blessings.... They are not so much entertainment tunes, but music that expresses other important things about my relationship to life. This music is, dare I say, more spiritual."

Schroer shared a tune he called, Poised with two of his students on July 2, 2008. He died of his illness the following morning. His final words were, "Well, I guess no excursions today."

Three months after his death, Schroer's CD Hymns and Hers was nominated for four Canadian Folk Music Awards:

- Pushing the Boundaries
- Contemporary Album of the Year
- Solo Instrumentalist
- Producer

Hymns and Hers subsequently won two Canadian Folk Music Awards on November 23, 2008, in the categories of "Pushing the Boundaries" and "Solo Instrumentalist".

"Enthralled", a duo album Oliver recorded with Irish flautist and singer Nuala Kennedy, was released in 2012 on Borealis Records and was nominated for Instrumental Group of the Year and Ensemble of the Year at the Canadian Folk Music Awards 2012.

== Discography ==
- Jigzup (1993), Big Dog Music – Nominated for a Juno Award in the Best Roots or Traditional Album category
- Whirled (1994), Big Dog Music
- Stewed Tomatoes (1996), Big Dog Music
- Celtica (1998), Avalon
- O2 (Double CD, 1999), Big Dog Music
- Restless Urban Primitive (2001), Big Dog Music
- A Million Stars (2004), Big Dog Music
- Camino (2006), Big Dog Music
- Celtic Devotion (2006), Avalon Records
- Hymns and Hers (2007), Big Dog Music
- Smithers (Double CD, 2007), Big Dog Music
- Freedom Row (2010), Borealis
- Enthralled Oliver Schroer and Nuala Kennedy, (2012) Borealis
