= Thomas Simpson Sproule =

Canadian politician

The Honourable Thomas Simpson Sproule PC
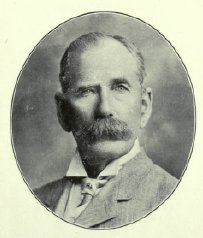

13th Speaker of the House of Commons of Canada
- In office November 15, 1911 – December 2, 1915
- Preceded by: Charles Marcil
- Succeeded by: Albert Sévigny

Canadian Senator from Ontario
- In office 1915–1917
- Appointed by: Robert Borden

Member of Parliament for Grey East
- In office 1878–1915
- Preceded by: William Kingston Flesher
- Succeeded by: District was abolished in 1914

Personal details
- Born: October 25, 1843 King Township, Upper Canada
- Died: November 10, 1917 (aged 74) Markdale, Ontario, Canada
- Party: Conservative
- Education: University of Michigan

Thomas Simpson Sproule (October 25, 1843 – November 10, 1917) was a Canadian parliamentarian, Speaker of the House of Commons of Canada from 1911–1915, and a member of the Canadian Senate from 1915–1917.

== Early life and education ==
Sproule was born to James and Jane (née Mitchell) Sproule, farmers who had emigrated to King Township, Canada West from County of Tyrone, Ireland.

His parents moved to Grey County when he was young, and he attended public schools there before studying at University of Michigan and Victoria University in Cobourg. He left school for two years before returning to Victoria University, graduating in 1868 with a degree in medicine.

== Doctor, businessman, politician, and husband ==
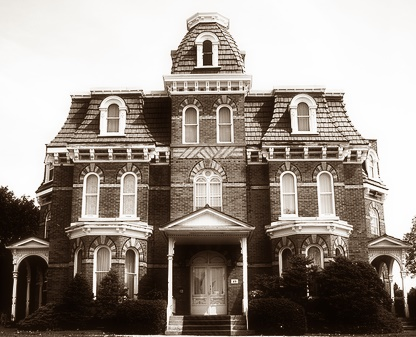
Knarsboro Hall, Markdale

After his graduation, Sproule first practised medicine at Craighurst, Ontario, before he moved to Galesburg, Michigan. He moved back to Grey County, and settled in Markdale, Ontario, where in addition to his medical practice, he also opened a drug store, bought a large cattle farm, and invested in local businesses such as a flour mill and lumber yard.

He turned to politics and succeeded the retiring William Kingston Flesher as MP of Grey East in the 1878 election as a Conservative MP. He also fell in love with Flesher's daughter, Mary Alice, and wooed her by having a beautiful Italianate house that he called Knarsboro Hall built for her in Markdale. The couple was married in 1881, and had a daughter, Lillian.

Sproule was also related to the famous NHL Toronto St. Patricks owner Harvey Sproule. Thomas Sproule's niece was Mary Elizabeth Sproule Head, of Milton, Ontario, who along with her husband, John Head, cared for her young nephew Harvey Sproule and his sister.

Sproule was subsequently re-elected to Parliament eight times in succession. Both Sproule and his wife were dedicated teetotallers and Prohibitionists, and when Mary Alice Sproule was the hostess of her husband's political functions, she never allowed alcohol to be served.

== Political views ==
Sproule was a staunch Protestant from an Irish Unionist background. He was a member of the Orange Order, and rose to the position of "Master and Sovereign." In 1906, he became "President of the Imperial Grand Council of the World." The Order was noted for its anti-French and anti-Catholic views, particularly at the time.

As a Conservative MP, he was a supporter of Canadian prime minister Sir John A. Macdonald, but his loyalty to Orangeism led him to differ with his party's leadership on issues of language and religion, particularly on the Manitoba Schools Question. Sproule opposed any concession to Catholic separate schools or French-language instruction.

Following the fall of the Conservative government in the 1896 election, largely by the divisions over the school issue, he became a pronounced critic of the immigration policies of Sir Wilfrid Laurier's government. Sproule opposed the admission to Canada of non-British migrants. He supported the abolition of French-language instruction in Ontario schools, and the implementation of Regulation 17. Sproule also opposed the expansion of French-language services by the federal government.

== Speaker of the House ==
Following the defeat of the Laurier government in the 1911 election, the new Conservative Prime Minister, Robert Laird Borden, nominated Sproule to the position of Speaker of the House of Commons. Because Sproule had to lead the House in prayers in both English and French, he embarked on French lessons despite being a lifelong opponent of the language.

During a thirty-six-day filibuster on the question of the government's naval bill, Sproule lost his patience after weeks of 24-hour sessions, and became the first Speaker ever to "name" a member of the House for disorderly conduct.

== Illness and death ==
Sproule was forced to retire from the Speakership due to ill health, and was named to the Senate of Canada in 1915. He served for two years until his death in 1917. Four years after his death, Sproule's wife Mary Alice sold Knarsboro Hall, the house Sproule had built for her, and went to live with her daughter where she stayed until her death in 1941.

== Electoral record ==
1878 Canadian federal election: Grey East
Party	Candidate	Votes
Conservative	Thomas Simpson Sproule	1,664
Unknown	A. Gifford	1,133
Source: Canadian Elections Database

1882 Canadian federal election: Grey East
Party	Candidate	Votes
Conservative	Thomas Simpson Sproule	1,934
Unknown	Peter Christie	1,520

1887 Canadian federal election: Grey East
Party	Candidate	Votes
Conservative	Thomas Simpson Sproule	2,400
Liberal	Robert Gilray	1,845

1891 Canadian federal election: Grey East
Party	Candidate	Votes
Conservative	Thomas Simpson Sproule	1,977
Liberal	John Clark	1,958

1896 Canadian federal election: Grey East
Party	Candidate	Votes
Conservative	Thomas S. Sproule	2,560
Patrons of Industry	James Bowes	2,039

1900 Canadian federal election: Grey East
Party	Candidate	Votes
Conservative	T. S. Sproule	2,707
Liberal	C. W. Hartman	2,342

1904 Canadian federal election: Grey East
Party	Candidate	Votes
Conservative	Thos S. Sproule	2,209
Liberal	Clayton W. Hartman	1,527

1908 Canadian federal election: Grey East
Party	Candidate	Votes
Conservative	Thomas Simpson Sproule	2,396
Liberal	Elzear Raymond	1,260

1911 Canadian federal election: Grey East
Party	Candidate	Votes
Conservative	Thomas Simpson Sproule	2,560
Liberal	Clayton Webb Hartman	1,475
