= Vandeleur, Ontario =

Coordinates: 44°19′57″N 80°33′34″W

Location of Vandeleur in Ontario

Vandeleur is a community in Grey County, Ontario, Canada, located within the municipality of Grey Highlands. Vandeleur thrived as a small community in Grey County well into the 1890s, when it began to decline in the face of a great migration of Grey and Bruce County settlers to the more fertile plains of Western Canada. Vandeleur's only remaining structures are an Orange Hall and the former Public School No. 11, a brick building erected in 1892 on the site of the original one-room school.
