= Flesherton =

- Unincorporated community/ designated place
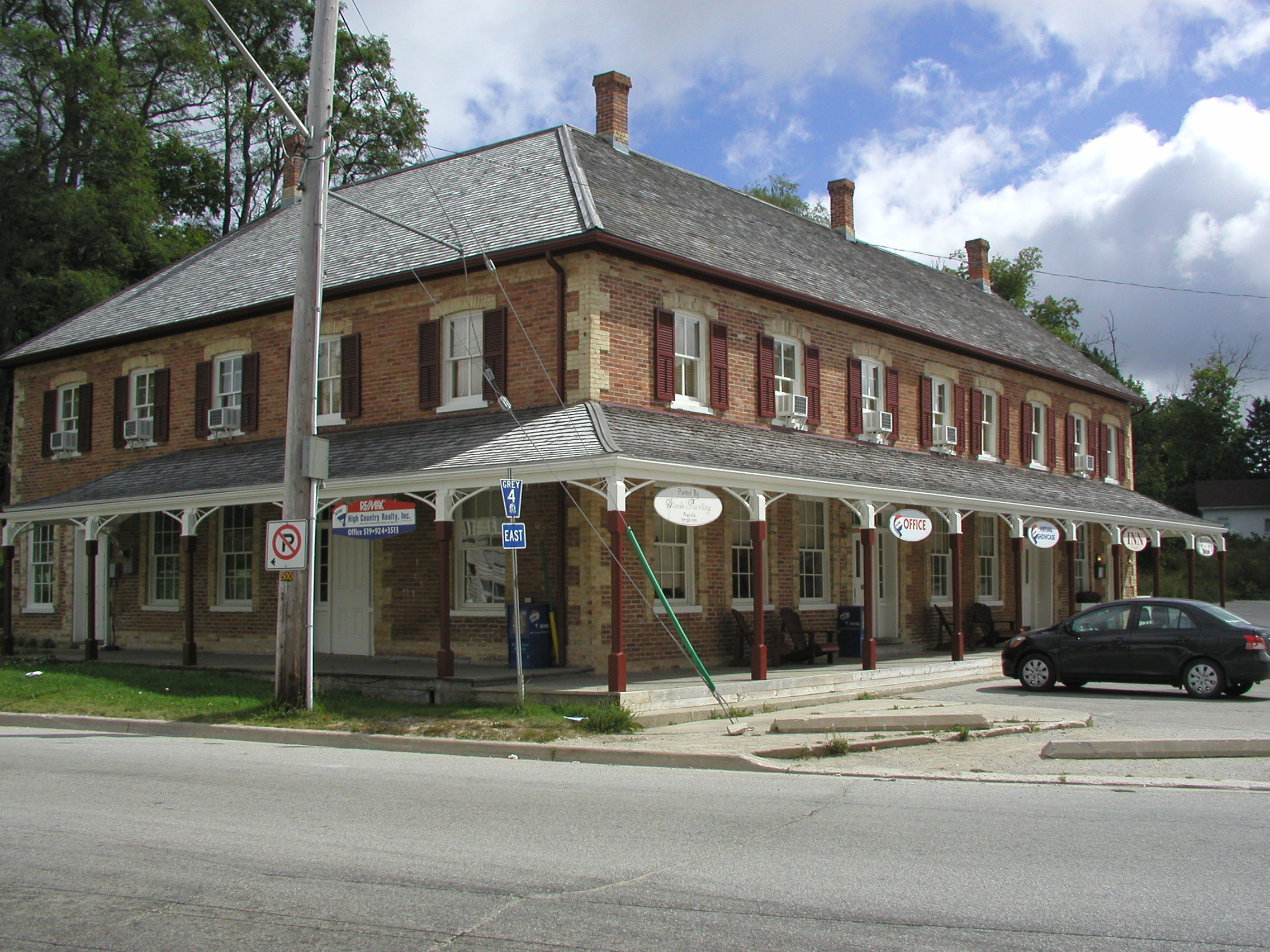
- Munshaw House, built in 1864 as a stage coach stop at the junction of Toronto-Sydenham Road and Durham Road.
- Nickname: Gateway to the Beaver Valley
- Location within Southern Ontario
- Coordinates: 44°15′47″N 80°33′02″W
- Country: Canada
- Province: Ontario
- County: Grey
- Municipality: Grey Highlands
- Settled: 1850
- Incorporated: 1912
- Dissolved (amalgamated): January 1, 1998

Government
  - Fed. riding: Bruce—Grey—Owen Sound
  - Prov. riding: Bruce—Grey—Owen Sound

Area
  - Land: 3.64 km^{2} (1.41 sq mi)

Population (2021)
  - Total: 590
  - Density: 162.2/km^{2} (420/sq mi)
- Time zone: UTC−5 (Eastern)
- Postal code: N0C 1E0
- Area code(s): 519, 226, 548
- Highways: Highway 10

Flesherton is a community in the Municipality of Grey Highlands, in Grey County, Ontario, Canada, located at the junction of Highway 10 and Grey County Road 4 (formerly Highway 4). Although the area initially showed a high rate of growth in the 1850s and its founder believed that it would become an important centre of economic activity, growth stagnated when a rail link bypassed it, and the community never grew larger than a village.

== History ==
=== Prehistory ===
A Paleolithic quartzite arrowhead that had been quarried north of the Great Lakes was discovered near Flesherton in 1974. Whether it was carried south to the Flesherton area around the east side of Georgian Bay, or dates back to a time when a land bridge existed between the Bruce Peninsula and Manitoulin Island, the arrowhead does point to prehistoric interaction between people of the Flesherton region and those of northern Ontario.

Local archaeological digs indicate that by 1500 BCE, the area around Flesherton was settled by the Turtle First Nation, a member of the agrarian Petuns nation allied with the Hurons. Samuel de Champlain called them "Cheveux Releves" (French for "standing or high hairs"); later French traders referred to them as the Petuns (French for "tobacco growers").

=== Nineteenth century ===
The Turtle First Nation continued to live in the Flesherton area until they were forced to surrender their lands to the British Crown in 1818.

==== Settlement ====
In 1848, the land along the north-south Toronto-Sydenham road and the east-west Durham Road was surveyed and divided into 50-acre lots. The intersection of the two roads, which lay in a small valley, was named Artemesia Corners. To encourage settlement of the wilderness, the lots were granted to settlers, who then had to clear at least twelve of the acres within five years in order to receive free title to the lot. The first settler at Artemesia Corners was Aaron Munshaw Jr., a former member of Button's Troop during the War of 1812, and an active member of the Upper Canada Rebellion of 1838. Following the failed rebellion, he had fled into exile in the United States with William Lyon Mackenzie. In 1850, having been granted amnesty, Munshaw moved to Artemesia Corners and settled a 50-acre lot on the east side of the Toronto-Sydenham Road that straddled Durham Road. He built a small tavern and stagecoach stop at the intersection of the two roads. Munshaw's father, Aaron Sr., also moved to the area, becoming one of the first farmers in the district.

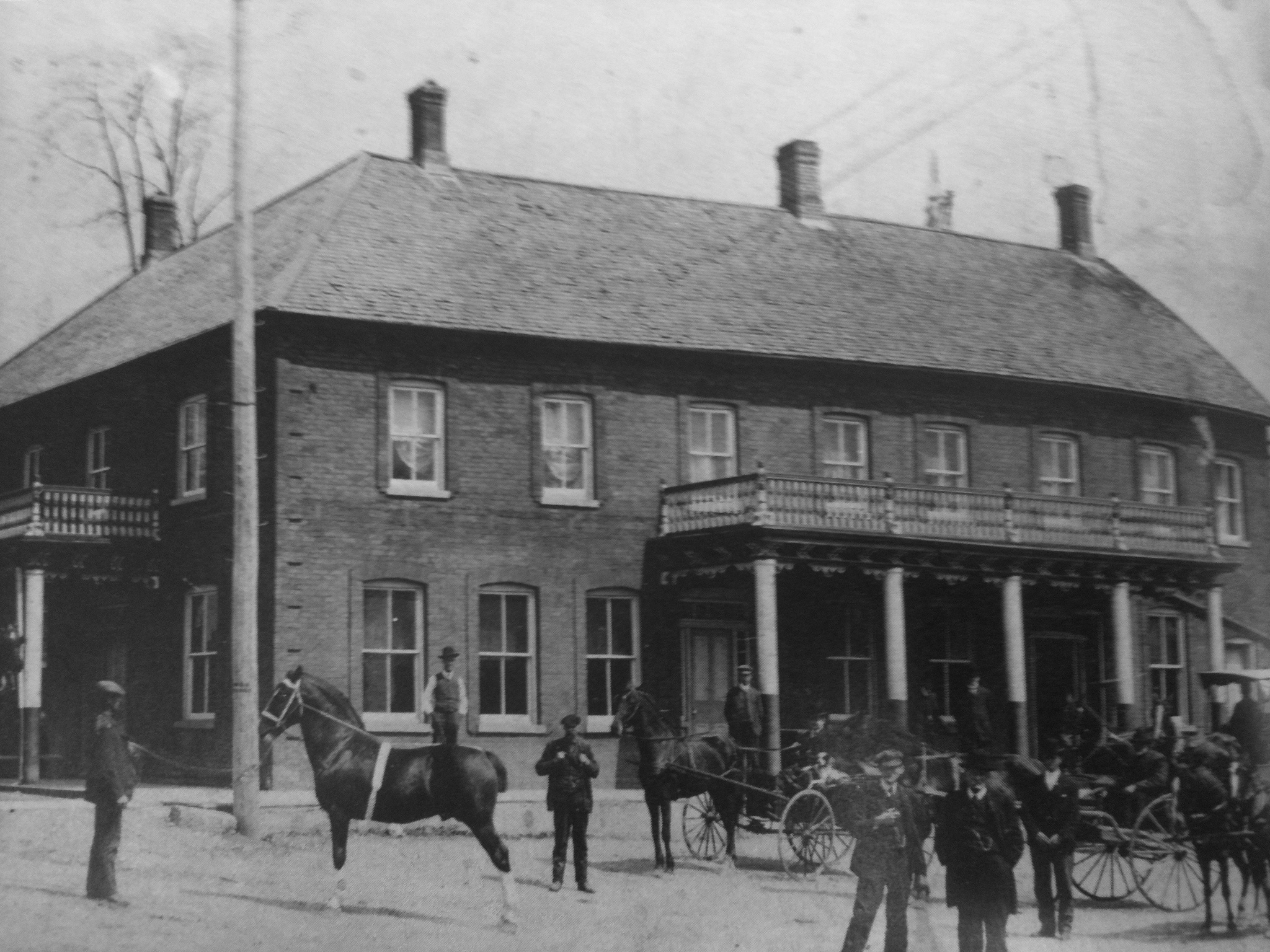
Munshaw Hotel in 1895. (Compare to modern photograph above)

William Kingston Flesher, a recent British immigrant, settled on the 50-acre lot on the opposite side of the Toronto-Sydenham Road from Munshaw in 1853 and built a saw mill, and then a grist mill on the Boyne River that flowed through the valley. Both Munshaw and Flesher also laid out the portions of their acreages as village lots, hoping to encourage people to move to the area. Throughout the 1850s, more settlers, mainly Scottish immigrants, claimed lots and began to clear the land; tradespeople quickly arrived and bought the village lots at Artemesia Corners.

In 1864, as the village grew, Munshaw built a larger inn and stagecoach stop that incorporated some parts of the original hotel. This building, operated as a hotel by the Munshaw family until the 1960s, is now known as Munshaw House and still stands on the original spot.

==== Big Boom ====
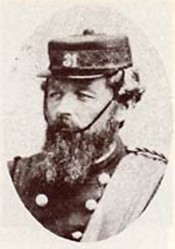
W.K. Flesher in captain's militia uniform, 31st "Grey" Regiment, at Niagara-on-the-Lake during the Fenian Raids of 1866.

W.K. Flesher became a prominent local figure, acting at various times as postmaster, magistrate, druggist, and even doctor, as well as warden of Grey County (1855–1857, 1861–1862, 1865 and 1867), and reeve of the village (1854–1865 and 1866–1878). He organized a Masonic Lodge, and was a vocal booster of the village, convincing other businesses to settle in the area, including a woolen (fulling) mill owned by his son William Henry in 1863. Flesher also became captain of the local militia, No. 6 Company of the 31st Grey Regiment, and travelled with the regiment to train at Niagara-on-the-Lake during the Fenian Raids of 1866. In recognition of his contributions, the name of the settlement was changed first to Flesher's Corners, and then, when a more "village-like" name was seen as desirable, to Flesherton.

The Gazetteer and Directory of the County of Grey for 1865-66 listed 27 prominent businessmen in the village and pointed out that much development had occurred recently:

"The Sawmill, the fulling mill, the stores, &c., are all the result of the last two or three years. The village has a post office, 3 stores, 2 taverns, several carpenters, a pump-maker, a blacksmith shop, a Sawmill, a carding and fulling mill, 2 churches, 2 resident clergymen, and a resident physician."

In 1872, Flesher was elected to the House of Commons as MP for the riding of Grey East, and he was re-elected in 1874.

About this time, a mini-land boom ensued as speculators bet that the Toronto, Grey & Bruce Railway would pass through Flesherton. However, due to Flesherton's location in a valley, the railroad was routed around the edge of the valley 2 km (1.3 mi) to the west through the hamlet of Ceylon. The first train arrived in 1873 to much local celebration, but a serious blow had been dealt to the aspirations of the village.

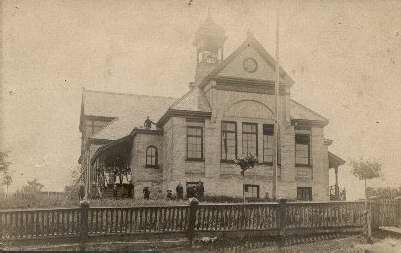
Flesherton Public School in 1903. Built in 1891, it was used as a schoolhouse until 1968, and was destroyed by fire in 2009.

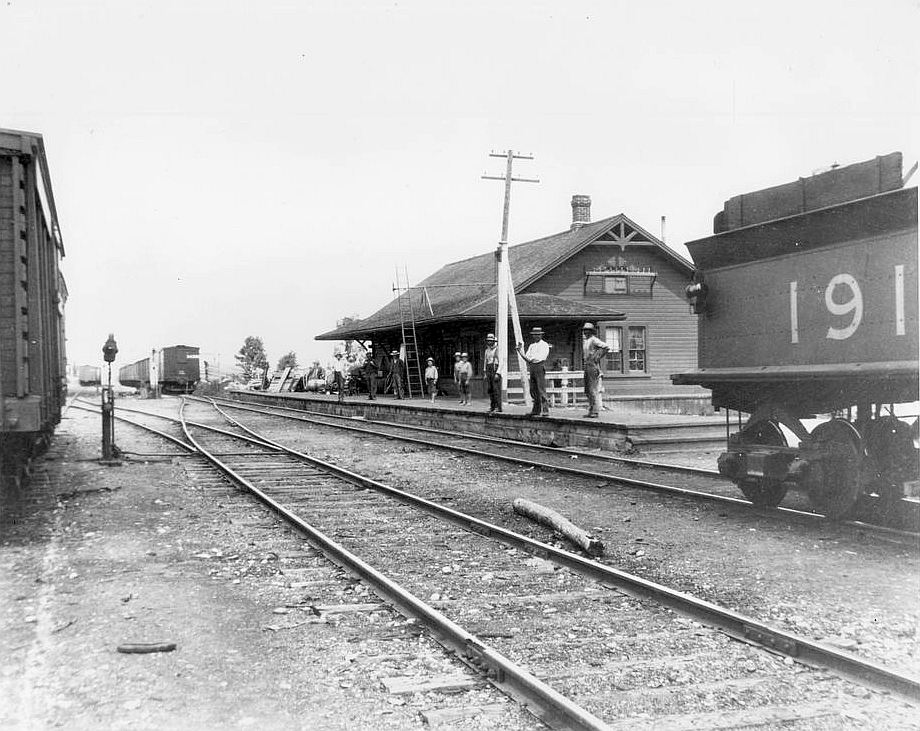
Flesherton C.P.R. Station, c. 1900, located 2 km (1.3 mi) to the west of the village

Methodist circuit riders had been visiting the area since 1850, usually using someone's house or the parlour of the Munshaw Hotel for worship. By 1864, there were two wood-frame churches, a Methodist and a Wesleyan. In 1876, W.K. Flesher donated some of his land for construction of a permanent Methodist church. The red brick church was finished a year later, and dedicated on 18 November 1877 by Egerton Ryerson, provincial Minister of Education. Two years later, in 1879, the local Presbyterians erected Chalmers Presbyterian Church where the Toronto-Sydenham Road crossed the Boyne River. In 1886, Baptists built Cedar Springs Baptist Church at the east end of the village.

In 1881, A.R. Fawcett published the first issue of the Flesherton Advance newspaper. In 1888, Fawcett sold the paper to Willard Thurston. Thurston, and eventually his son Frank, continued to publish the Advance until 1961.

In 1891, W.K. Flesher donated land for the construction of a public school, which was built for about $1000. This large three-room yellow brick building became Flesherton Public School and served as the village children's elementary school until 1968.

The year 1891 was also when telephone service was extended to Flesherton, and a village telephone exchange employed local women as operators until the introduction of dial service in 1967.

In 1894, John Nuhn Sr. bought the woolen mill from Peter Campbell, who had purchased it in 1863, and was successful enough that Nuhn soon operated a mail order business across Canada for blankets, yarn, underwear and girls' black wool stockings. His son, John Jr., took over the business in 1931, and rebuilt another mill and warehouse when the original burned down in 1934. The mill continued to operate until the younger Nuhn's death in 1954.

==== Stagnation ====
By the mid-1880s, the nearby railway station in Ceylon was a busy place with three railyards, since goods travelling to western Canada—including troops sent to quell the Riel Rebellion of 1886—were shipped up this line from Toronto to Owen Sound, and from there by boat to Lake Superior. However, the economic boom did not extend to the nearby village down in the valley. Although the train station was relatively close, new businesses balked at moving to the village, since their goods to be shipped by rail would first have to be hauled by horses out of the steep valley. Economic growth stagnated, and the population remained below 1000.

=== Twentieth century ===
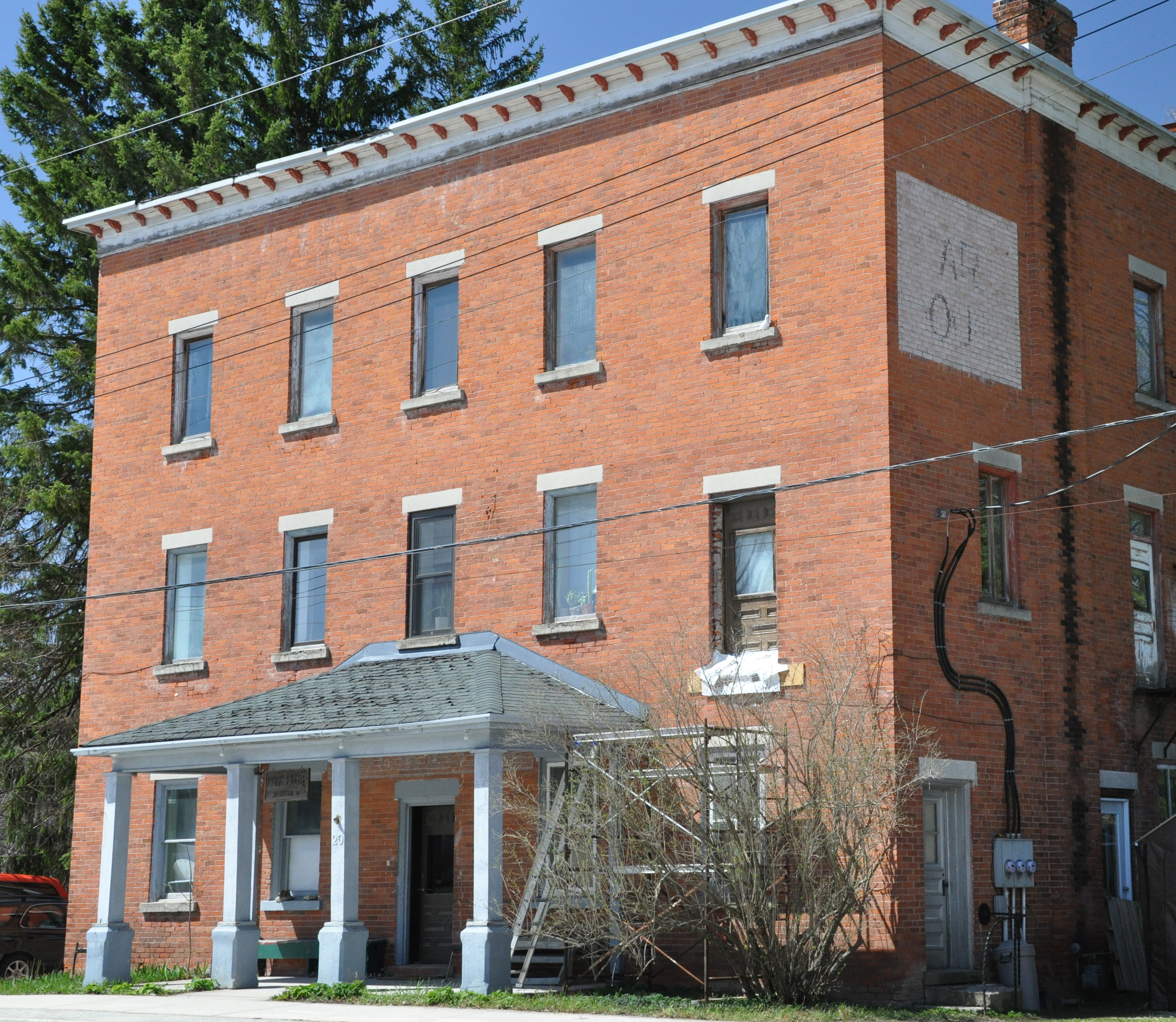
Park House, originally built as a "temperance" hotel

At the turn of the 20th century, the Munshaw Hotel continued to serve alcohol despite the increasingly popular temperance movement, but local teetotalling businessmen raised funds in 1908 to build a hotel called Park House as a "dry" alternative. The hotel remained in business until the 1950s, and is now a private residence.

In 1910, the Artemesia Rural High School was built in Flesherton; students either rode from their farms to attend classes or boarded at Park House. That same year, a block of businesses on the north-east corner of the hamlet's main intersection, known as the T.J. Sproule Block, burned down due to unknown causes, destroying a quarter of the local businesses.

In 1912, five years after the death of William Flesher in 1907, Flesherton was incorporated as a village. The following year, the coming of the automobile resulted in Flesherton's first gas station, attached to a hardware store.

Two years later, in 1914, World War I broke out in Europe. Eighty-four local men enlisted in the Canadian Expeditionary Force, a significant percentage of the small village's population. Several were decorated for bravery, and 19 volunteers—almost 1 in 4—were killed. In 1920, the children of William Flesher donated land beside the Boyne River, close to the site of Flesher's original grist mill, for a Memorial Park. A cenotaph was erected, with the names of those who had died on the front, and those who had survived on the back.

In 1917, the first airplane landed in Flesherton, piloted by Alf Witten of Camp Borden.

In 1920, the Toronto-Sydenham Road that ran through Flesherton was assumed by the province and became King's Highway 10. Likewise in the 1930s, the Durham Road as far as the centre of Flesherton was assumed by the province as the easternmost extension of King's Highway 4. (In the 1970s, Highway 4 was extended from the centre of Flesherton eastward a further 12 km (5 mi) to the village of Singhampton. However, in 1998, the provincial government under Mike Harris downloaded most of Highway 4 back onto municipal governments, the result being that Highway 4 is now known as Grey Road 4 as it passes through Flesherton.)

In 1921, Agnes Macphail, who had been born in nearby Proton Township, was elected to the House of Commons as a member of the Progressive Party of Canada for the Grey Southeast riding in the 1921 federal election. She was the first female MP in Canada. Macphail was re-elected in 1925, 1926, and 1930.

In 1925, the United Church of Canada was formed from an amalgamation of the Methodist, Presbyterian and Congregational Churches, and the following year, the Methodist church in Flesherton joined with Chalmers Presbyterian to form St. John's United Church. The combined congregations chose to retain the highly visible Methodist building, and sold the much smaller Presbyterian building.

Fire continued to be a major threat to the village. In 1926, the original horse barn attached to the Munshaw Hotel burned down. The following year, a fire that started in a grocery store destroyed an entire block of homes and businesses.

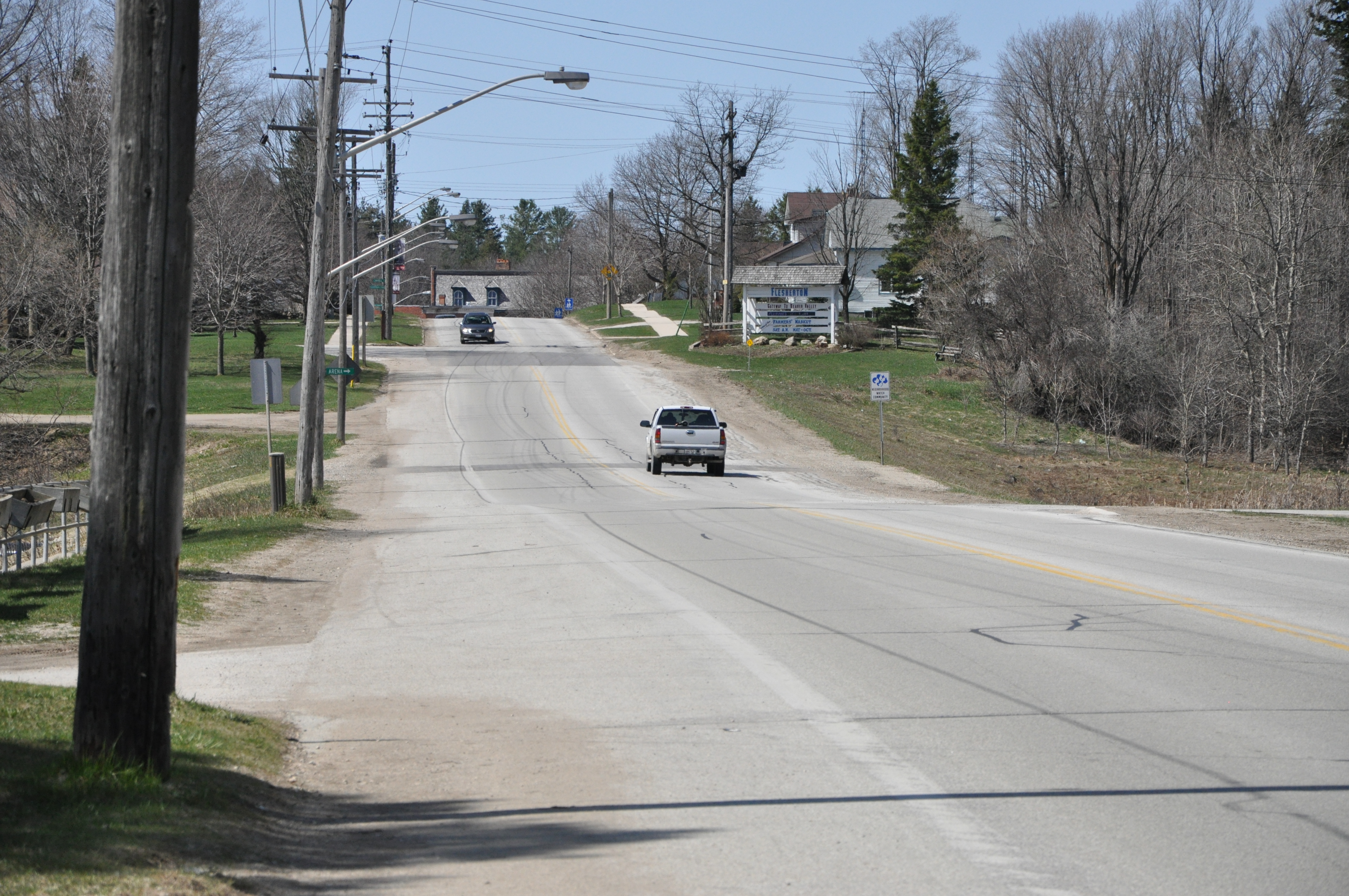
The dip in the highway south of the village marks the location of the 1931 sinkhole. The dark strip of asphalt the truck is about to cross marks the latest repair as the highway continues to sink.

In 1931, during resurfacing of Highway 10, the existence of a large sinkhole just south of the village was revealed when a load of gravel caused a 30-metre (100-ft) section the highway to sink more than 3 metres (10 feet). Although filled in and paved over, this section of the highway continues to slowly sink and requires a new patch of asphalt every few years as the old asphalt is pulled apart.

In 1939, enlistment at the start of the Second World War was again popular with local men; the names of the seven men who did not return were added to the cenotaph following the war.

In 1949, a fire and explosion at a gas station destroyed or damaged several businesses.

In 1952, the decision was made to expand the 40-year-old high school. However, during construction, a fire started in the older part of the structure, destroying it although sparing the new construction. The new extension continued to serve as the local high school.

In 1968, Grey Highlands Secondary School was built in Flesherton to serve a large catchment area formerly covered by three smaller high schools. The placement of this school in Flesherton was considered a controversial decision at the time, since the town of Markdale, 10 km (6 mi) to the north, was larger and was already home to the local school board offices. The arrival of the new high school's teaching and support staff and their families raised the village's population from 480 to 700, the first significant growth in over 80 years. With the new secondary school in place, the former high school was converted to Macphail Memorial Elementary School; this new elementary school in turn replaced all of the one- and two-room schoolhouses in the district, including the 77-year-old Flesherton Public School. This was also the year that Walter Walls, owner of the Dundalk Herald, bought the Flesherton Advance, closed the paper's Flesherton offices after 87 years of operation and moved publication 15 km (11 mi) south to Dundalk. The Advance has been published in Dundalk since that time.

In 1969, yet another major fire in the downtown district destroyed several 19th-century buildings on the southwest corner of the main intersection.

In 1974, village councillor Gilbert Little proposed a festival to promote local businesses and draw tourist traffic to the area. The result was the Split Rail Festival, named after the zig-zag fences built by pioneers using cedar rails. The festival was so successful that it became an annual September event that ran until 2008. At the same time, an increased interest in local history led to the construction of the South Grey Museum and Historical Library in a corner of Memorial Park in 1974.

On January 1, 1998, Flesherton was amalgamated with the Township of Artemesia by the Mike Harris government. (In 2001, Artemesia itself was amalgamated with several other townships to form the municipality of Grey Highlands).

=== Twenty-first century ===
In 2006, the old Macphail Memorial Elementary School (originally Flesherton High School) was torn down and a new school with the same name was constructed close to the same spot.

In 2008, the old Flesherton Public School, built in 1891 and unused since 1968, was destroyed by fire.

Flesherton now has two schools, an arena and community centre, post office, several parks, a hiking area known as The Flesherton Hills (100 acres located behind the High School), a swimming pond, the South Grey Museum, a Canadian Legion Hall, a public library, two churches, and a cemetery and crematorium. Businesses include art galleries—the area has become home to many artists and musicians—several antiques and collectibles shops, restaurants, a hardware store, real estate offices, several auto sales and service businesses, a funeral home, and a branch of a national bank. Businesses in the area—including those in the villages of Priceville, Ceylon, Eugenia, Kimberley, Maxwell, Rock Mills and Feversham—are represented by the Flesherton and District Chamber of Commerce, which grew out of the Flesherton Service Club. The Chamber hosts the annual Community Awards since 1997, honouring business and community leaders, and supports the Walking Village Initiative – encouraging residents and visitors to experience the area on foot.

== Demographics ==
In the 2021 Census of Population conducted by Statistics Canada, Flesherton had a population of 590 living in 246 of its 278 total private dwellings, a change of 1% from its 2016 population of 584. With a land area of 3.64 km^{2} (1.41 sq mi), it had a population density of 162.1/km^{2} (419.8/sq mi) in 2021.

Historical census populations – Flesherton

Year	Pop.	±%
1921	422	—
1931	482	+14.2%
1941	431	−10.6%
1951	463	+7.4%
1956	471	+1.7%
1961	515	+9.3%

Year	Pop.	±%
1966	514	−0.2%
1971	524	+1.9%
1976	568	+8.4%
1981	565	−0.5%
1986	582	+3.0%
1991	543	−6.7%

Year	Pop.	±%
1996	625	+15.1%
2001	617	−1.3%
2006	609	−1.3%
2011	648	+6.4%
2016	584	−9.9%
2021	590	+1.0%

Source: Statistics Canada

== Notable people ==
- Matt Galloway, CBC Radio personality, was raised in nearby Kimberley and attended Grey Highlands Secondary School.
- Agnes Macphail, the first woman elected to the House of Commons, was born in nearby Proton Township and served as MP of the local district for over a decade. The elementary school in Flesherton is named after her.
- Chris Neil, hockey player (NHL: Ottawa Senators, 2001–2017), was raised on a farm just outside Flesherton.
- Oliver Schroer, award-winning fiddler and recording, was raised in nearby Vandeleur and attended Grey Highlands.

== Resources ==
- Split Rail Country: A History of Artemesia Volume I now online
- Split Rail Country: A History of Artemesia Volume II 1985–2000 is presently being written
