= Eugenia, Ontario =

Eugenia
- Unincorporated community
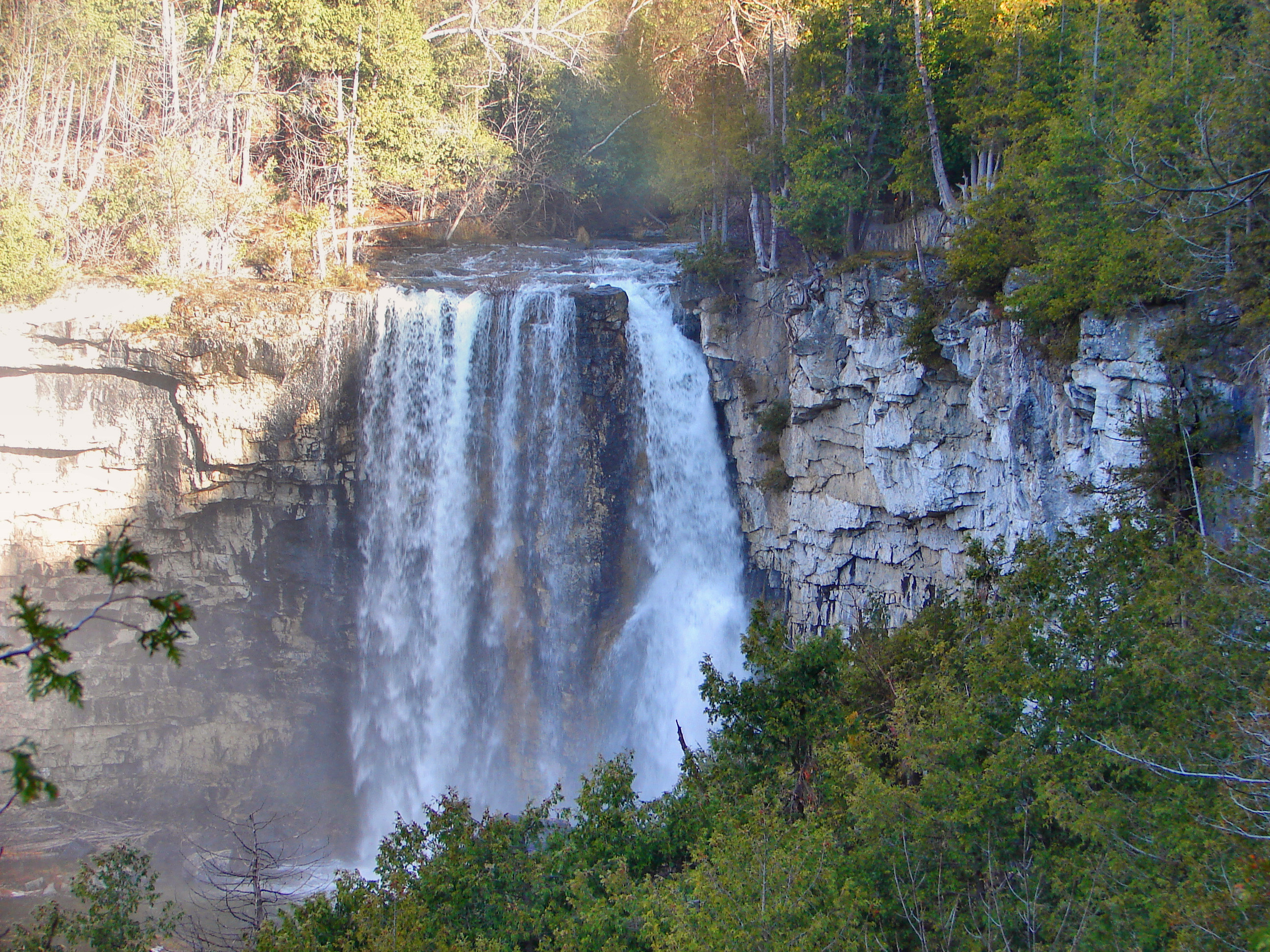
- Eugenia Falls

- Location of Eugenia in southern Ontario
- Coordinates: 44°18′42″N 80°31′08″W
- Country: Canada
- Province: Ontario
- County: Grey
- Municipality: Grey Highlands
- Time zone: UTC-5 (Eastern Time Zone)
  - Summer (DST): UTC-4 (Eastern Time Zone)
- Area codes: 519, 226

Eugenia is a small community in the municipality of Grey Highlands, Grey County, in Southwestern Ontario, Canada, located just north of the community of Flesherton. An unincorporated hamlet of Artemesia Township for most of its history, Eugenia was amalgamated into Grey Highlands in 2001.

Due to nearby Lake Eugenia, Eugenia Falls, the Bruce Trail and the ski resorts of the Beaver Valley, it has become a popular tourist and cottage destination. The nearby Eugenia Power Station has the highest head of water of any hydroelectric generator in Ontario, and has provided a significant amount of electricity to the provincial grid for a century.

== History ==
The area was surveyed and opened to settlement in the 1850s. Both the local river and the valley into which the river plunged were named for the plentiful beaver in the area. The hamlet of Eugenia, named after Princess Eugénie, the wife of Napoleon III, was established near the 25 metres (82 ft) waterfall.

In 1852, prospectors were also attracted to the area by rumours of gold, but after a fair-sized gold rush, it was discovered that the "gold" was only pyrite, or fool's gold.

By 1870, four mills operated on the Beaver River, and the growing community of 200 also featured several stores, Presbyterian and Methodist churches, a school, a carriage factory, a blacksmith, a cobbler and a carpenter.

However, in 1873, the Toronto, Grey & Bruce Railway bypassed the Beaver Valley area. Further development stagnated, and the hamlet's population never reached the size necessary for incorporation.

=== Hydroelectrical station and reservoir ===
In 1893, William Hogg, a local businessman, built the area's first electrical generator on the river below the falls. Using a paddlewheel to generate 70 kW from a 6 metres (20 ft) head of water, the station barely produced enough electricity to meet the needs of Eugenia and Flesherton.

At the turn of the 20th century, a group of businessmen, sensing profits to be made from the lucrative electrical industry, formed the Georgian River Power Consortium, and devised a plan to build a generator in the Beaver Valley and divert water from the Beaver River through pipes to the station. However, investors were skeptical, since this would require redirecting the river more than 2 kilometres (1.2 mi). Well-known power station engineer Hugh L. Cooper surveyed the site for the consortium, but reported that the project would be uneconomical because the Beaver River's capacity varied seasonally. Undeterred, the consortium hired a second engineer to survey the site and devise a plan for a reservoir. However, in 1912, the provincial government took control of all hydroelectric projects, including the Eugenia project, under the auspices of the Hydro-Electric Power Commission.

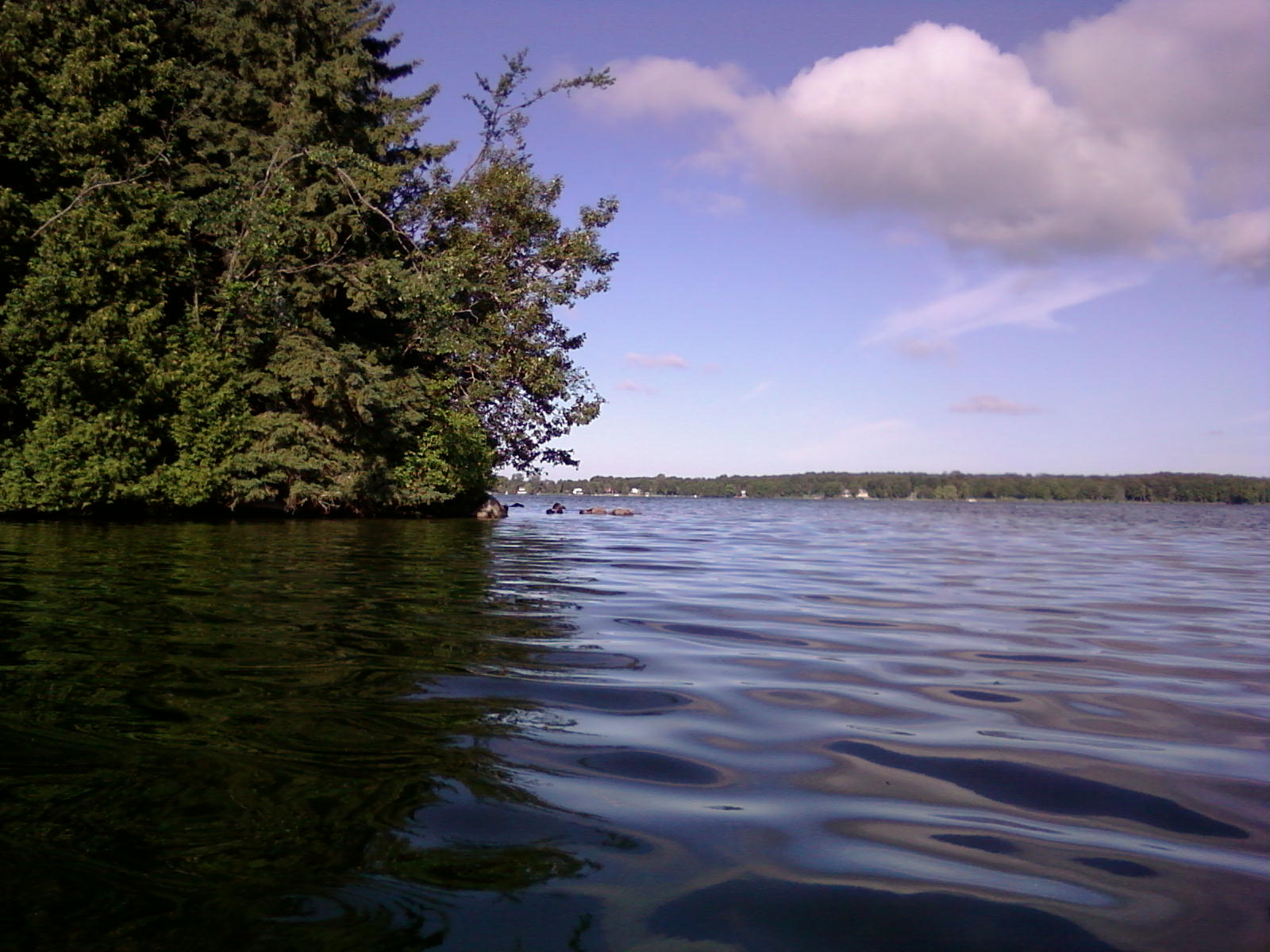
Lake Eugenia

The Commission decided to go ahead with the Eugenia project, and in 1914, the river beside the hamlet of Eugenia was dammed, creating a 200 hectares (490 acres) reservoir now known as Lake Eugenia. A generating station with two generators was built in the valley, and two 1,600 metres (5,200 ft) wooden penstocks constructed of Douglas fir carried water from the reservoir over the crest of the valley and down to the station. A third generator was added in 1920. With 180 metres (590 ft) of head—the tallest in Ontario—the station generated more than 4,500 kW. This provided electricity to the entire region, including the busy shipyards of Owen Sound and Collingwood.

By 1950, the reservoir had become a vacation destination, and cottages ringed its shores. However, in 1960, serious cracks were discovered in one of the 45-year-old dams. The Commission believed repairs, estimated at more than $500,000, would be uneconomical, and instead, lowered the level of the reservoir by 4 metres (13 ft) to relieve pressure on the dam. This left cottages more than 15 metres (49 ft) from the new shoreline, and the resulting protest by cottagers became a political issue, raised in the provincial legislature by the Opposition. In response, a new earthen dam was built in 1962, enabling the reservoir to be raised to its former level.

In 1999, control of Eugenia Station was transferred from Ontario Hydro to Ontario Power Generation.

== Today ==
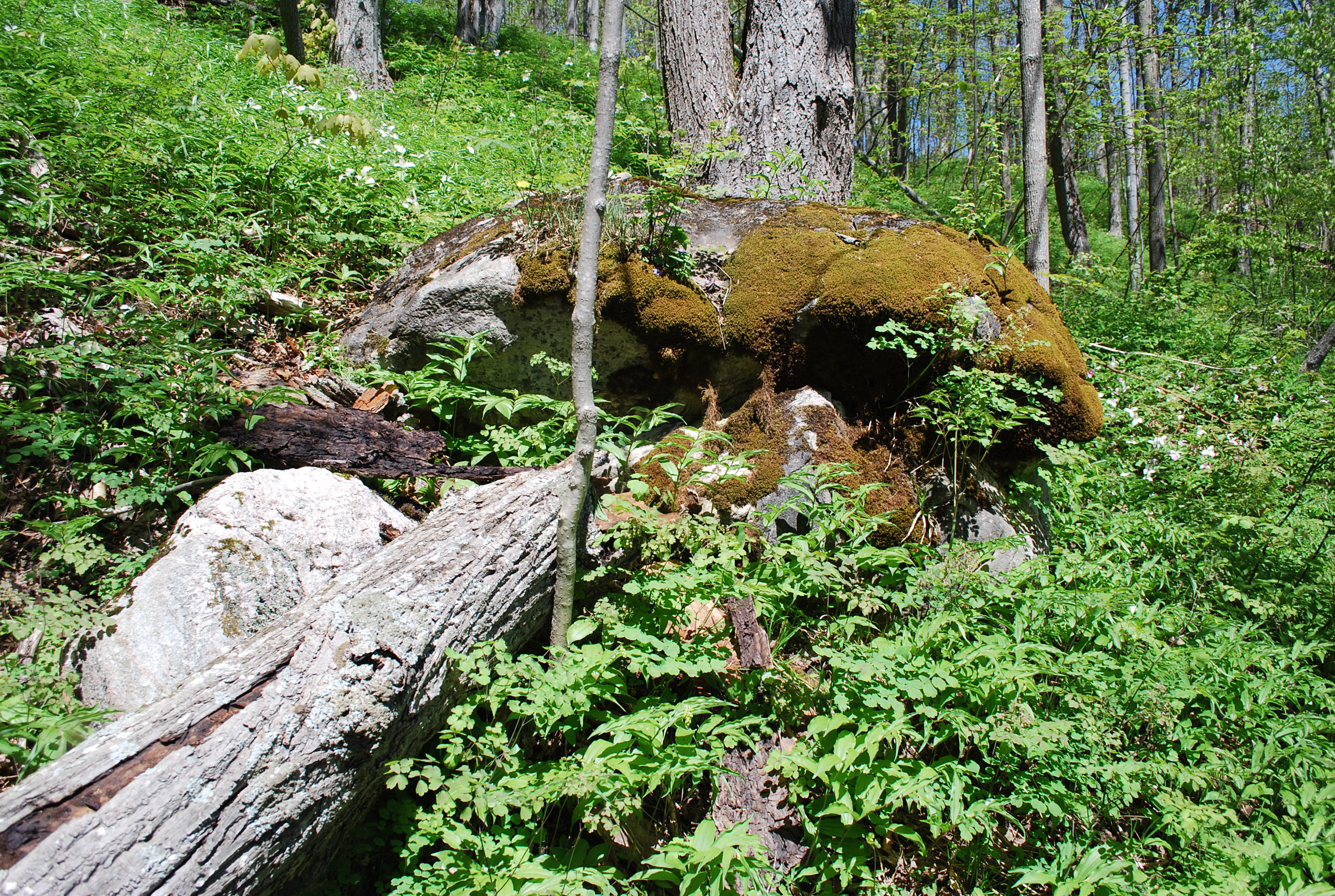
Eugenia is prized for its nature and large network of trails

Eugenia has become a tourist and cottage destination, and its businesses include a carpenter, several stores, several restaurants, several B&Bs, and a United Church.

Due to its relative proximity to Toronto, and the nearby Beaver Valley Ski Club ski resort, Lake Eugenia is a popular cottage destination, its shores home to about 400 cottages. Anglers are drawn by the lake's large mouth bass, rock bass, perch, sunfish and bullhead catfish.

The Bruce Trail, which follows the Niagara Escarpment through southwestern Ontario, runs through Eugenia. Because of this, there is also a large ancillary network of nature trails and conservation areas in the area.

=== Gold Rush Days ===
Every year in memory of the false gold rush of 1852, Eugenia hosts "Gold Rush Days", a weekend festival featuring food vendors, artisans, car shows, a silent auction and community meals.
