= Chris Neil =

Canadian ice hockey winger

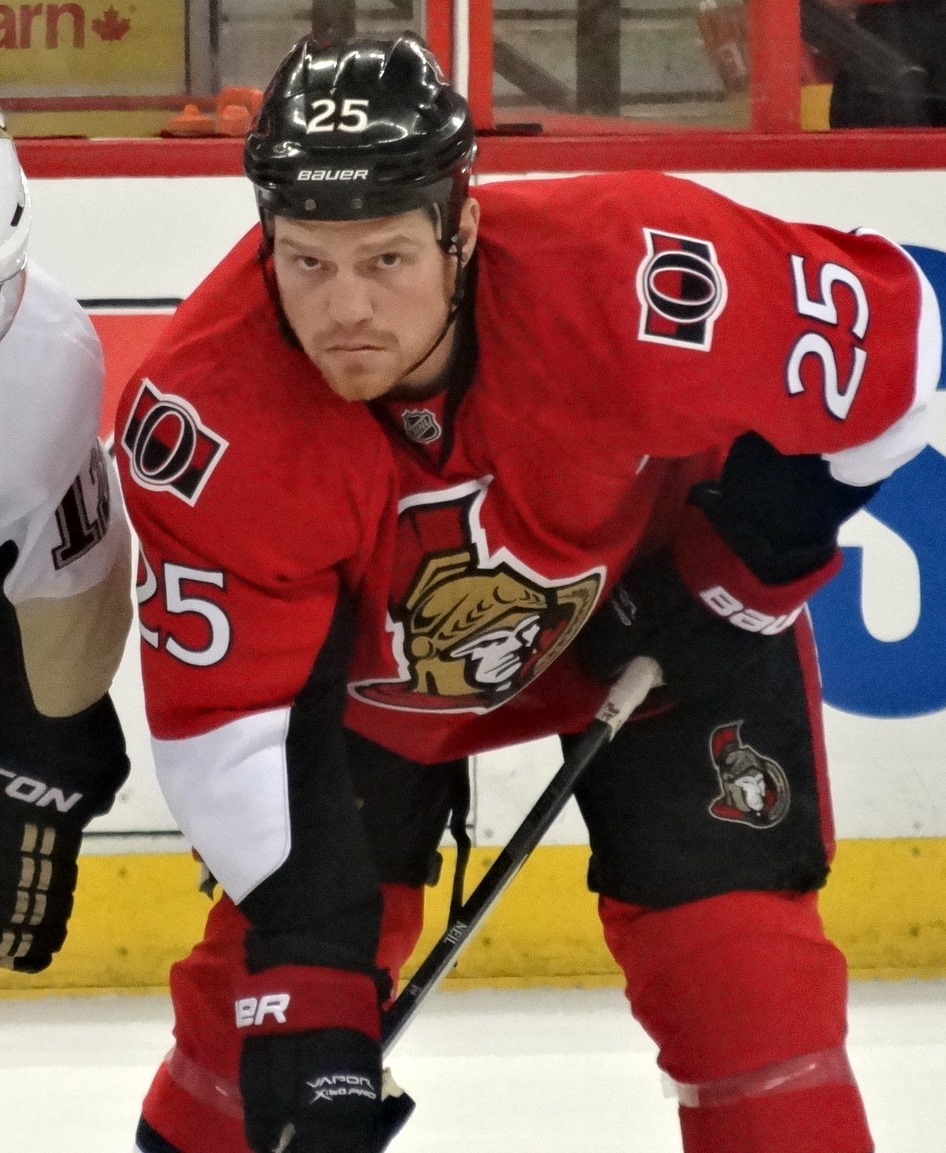
- Neil with the Ottawa Senators in May 2013
- Born: June 18, 1979 (age 47) Flesherton, Ontario, Canada
- Height: 6 ft 1 in (185 cm)
- Weight: 209 lb (95 kg; 14 st 13 lb)
- Position: Right wing
- Shot: Right
- Played for: Ottawa Senators
- NHL draft: 161st overall, 1998; Ottawa Senators
- Playing career: 2000–2017

Chris Neil (born June 18, 1979) is a Canadian former professional ice hockey right winger. Neil was drafted in the sixth round, 161st overall, in the 1998 NHL entry draft by the Ottawa Senators, and played his entire NHL career with the Senators organization. He was best known for his role as an enforcer. In September 2022, Neil became the vice president of business and community development for the Senators.

== Early life ==
Neil was born on June 18, 1979, in Flesherton, Ontario, Canada to parents Bonnie and Barry Neil. He was raised alongside three older brothers, whom he credits for his physical style of play. Neil's mother died in 2005 in a car accident.

== Playing career ==
=== Amateur ===
Growing up in Flesherton, Neil began skating with the Flesherton Minor Hockey Association at the age of five. He scored 15 goals and 30 points with the Orangeville Crushers during the 1995–96 season before being drafted into the Ontario Hockey League (OHL). He had been contacted by 12 OHL teams but was eventually drafted by the North Bay Centennials in the eighth round, 121st overall, of the 1996 OHL draft. Neil scored five goals and two assists through the first six games of the 1997–98 season before being suspended for five games. He set new career-highs in the 1998–99 season with 26 goals and 72 points in 66 games. After the Centennials were eliminated from the 1999 OHL playoffs, Neil joined the Muskegon Fury in the United Hockey League for their postseason run. He led the team with 62 penalty minutes through 17 playoff games. Once the season ended, Neil was drafted in the sixth round, 161st overall, of the 1998 NHL entry draft by the Ottawa Senators.

=== Professional ===
Neil spent two seasons with Ottawa's American Hockey League (AHL) affiliate, the Grand Rapids Griffins, before making his NHL debut during the 2001–02 season. Following a strong training camp and preseason, Neil was named to the Senators' opening night roster. He recorded one point and nine penalty minutes over his first eight NHL games. After making his NHL debut on October 3, 2001, against the Toronto Maple Leafs, he recorded his first NHL point the following day with an assist on Steve Martins' goal. Neil scored his first NHL goal in a 6–3 win over the Atlanta Thrashers on October 30. While he started the season with an inconsistent role, by late November the Senators began giving him more ice time. He also began playing on the Senators' power-play unit and finished the season ranked 10th among league rookies with 10 goals. Neil was placed on the team's injured list on March 21, 2002, after bruising his hip, but returned for the Senators' 2002 Stanley Cup playoffs run.

After a lengthy contract negotiation, Neil signed a three-year $1.755 contract extension with the Senators on September 14, 2002. However, shortly after signing, Neil broke his leg during an exhibition game against the Buffalo Sabres. He subsequently missed the first 12 games of the 2002–03 season before returning to the Senators lineup.

The 2005–06 season saw Neil's role with the Senators expand. When Brian McGrattan made the Ottawa line-up out of training camp, much of the responsibilities as "team enforcer" were lifted off Neil's shoulders, and he was given the opportunity to contribute in a more offensive role. He responded, and posted the best offensive totals of his NHL career with 16 goals and 33 points. The following season, Neil posted similar numbers with 12 goals and 28 points while leading the NHL in hits. The coaching staff rewarded him with special teams assignments, and he received regular power play shifts.

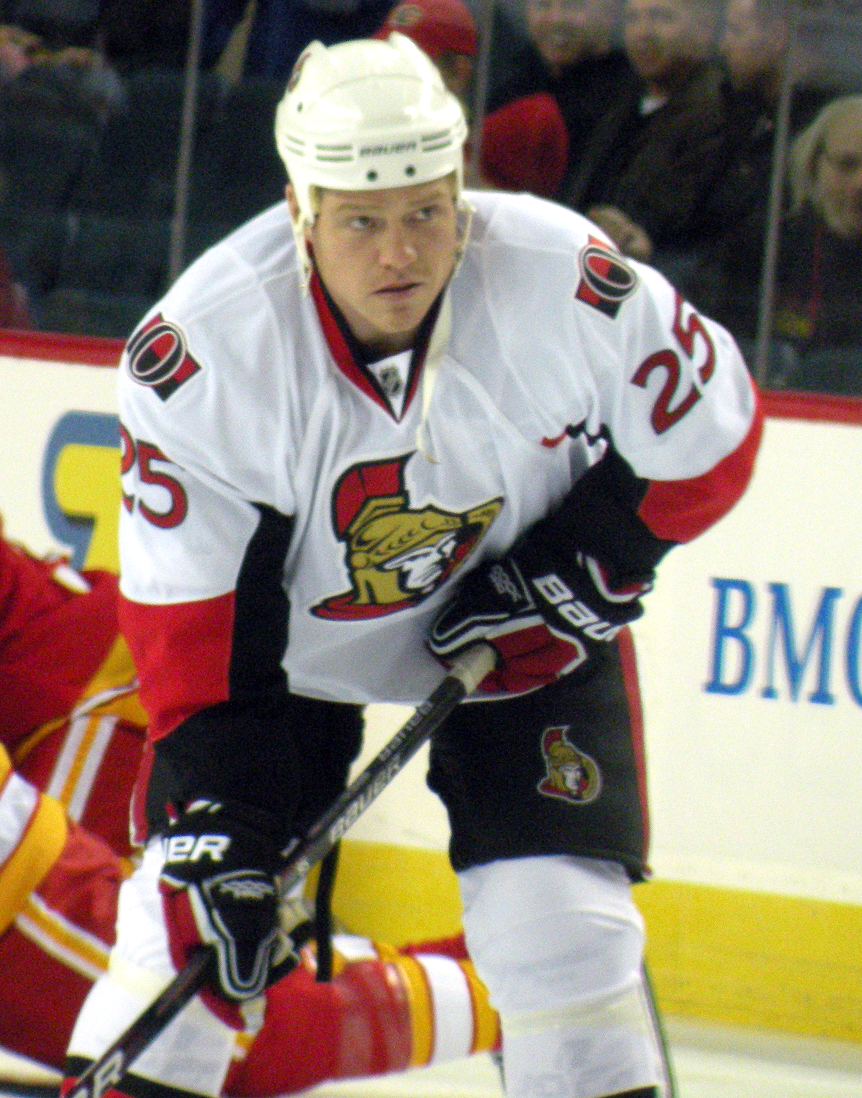
Neil with the Senators in March 2010.

As the 2007–08 season unfolded, Brian McGrattan saw very limited ice time, and Neil was once again called upon to act as the Senators' enforcer and primary physical presence on many nights. As a result, his offensive production declined, though he did finish the season with a respectable 20 points.

Neil had a disappointing 2008–09 season, registering only ten points, his lowest total since his rookie season, and the Senators missed the Stanley Cup playoffs for the first time during his tenure in Ottawa. After the season, Neil became an unrestricted free agent, and there was speculation that he would sign elsewhere. Instead, however, he signed a four-year, $8 million contract with the Senators. Neil reportedly received offers from three other clubs, but ended up accepting less money to remain in Ottawa.

The 2011–12 season was a good one for both Neil and the Senators. During the regular season, Neil registered 13 goals and 28 points in 72 games, his best offensive totals since 2006–07. Picked by many analysts to finish at or near the bottom of the standings, the Senators made the 2012 playoffs and came within one game of upsetting the first-seeded New York Rangers in the Eastern Conference Quarterfinals. In the series, Neil knocked forward Brian Boyle out of the series with a hit in game five that inflicted a concussion on the player. After the season, once enforcers Matt Carkner and Zenon Konopka departed Ottawa via free agency, the Senators subsequently re-signed Neil to a three-year contract worth $5.75 million.

During the 2012–13 NHL lock-out, Neil elected not to play in Europe, as several of his teammates did, and instead remained in Ottawa and practised with the Carleton Ravens, who were coached by his former teammate Shaun Van Allen.

Acknowledging his leadership role with the organization, the Senators named Neil an alternate captain on September 14, 2013. He scored his 100th career regular season NHL goal on January 23, 2014, against Ben Bishop of the Tampa Bay Lightning. Neil played in the 2014 Heritage Classic at Vancouver, registering an assist and two penalties.

As the 2014–15 season unfolded, Neil was hampered by a hamstring injury that kept him out of the line-up for several games, and he recorded just four goals and seven points in his first 38 games. As the team slipped out of the 2015 playoff picture, General Manager Bryan Murray approached Neil to gauge his willingness to accept a trade to a contending team; Neil indicated that he would prefer to stay in Ottawa, though trade rumours persisted and he saw his role diminish under new head coach Dave Cameron. As many as ten teams reportedly contacted Murray to inquire about Neil's availability as the NHL trade deadline approached. On February 14, 2015, the trade rumours were quieted as Neil suffered a fractured thumb in a fight with Edmonton Oilers winger Luke Gazdic, and the Senators subsequently announced that he would be out of the Ottawa line-up indefinitely as a result.

On February 28, 2016, Neil signed a one-year, $1.5 million contract extension with the Senators to return for the 2016-17 season. Neil played in his 1000th NHL game on December 10, 2016, a road game against the Los Angeles Kings. Neil squared off with Jordan Nolan during that game. Neil was then honored with a pregame ceremony prior to the Senators' December 14 home game against the San Jose Sharks.

In June 2017, it was announced that Neil and the Senators mutually separated due to Neil being displeased with his limited role under head coach Guy Boucher, allowing Neil to become an unrestricted free agent for the 2017-18 season. He did not sign with another team.

On December 14, 2017, Neil announced his retirement from professional ice hockey.

== Post-retirement career ==
Neil served as an assistant coach for his sons' ice hockey teams. In January 2022, Neil and two business partners opened Icelynd Skating Trails, an outdoor skating facility in Stittsville, on land he had purchased while he was still a player. The facility has two skating loops in the forest as well as an outdoor rink, which is rented out for minor league hockey teams and other group events. On September 7, 2022, Neil was promoted to Vice President of Business and Community Development for the Senators. He was previously an Alumni Ambassador representing the team at community events.

On November 8, 2022, the Senators announced that Neil's No. 25 would be retired by the team, with the ceremony to take place before a game against the Chicago Blackhawks on February 17, 2023.

== Personal life ==
Neil and his wife, Caitlin, have three children together. On July 14, 2011, Neil and his wife were introduced as the new honorary chairs of Roger's House, an Ottawa pediatric hospice.

Neil and his brothers own and operate Neil Brothers Construction in Flesherton.

== Career statistics ==
=== Regular season and playoffs ===
			Regular season					Playoffs
Season	Team	League	GP	G	A	Pts	PIM	GP	G	A	Pts	PIM
1995–96	Orangeville Crushers	MWJBHL	43	15	15	30	50	—	—	—	—	—
1996–97	North Bay Centennials	OHL	65	13	16	29	150	—	—	—	—	—
1997–98	North Bay Centennials	OHL	59	26	29	55	231	—	—	—	—	—
1998–99	North Bay Centennials	OHL	66	26	46	72	215	4	1	0	1	15
1998–99	Muskegon Fury	UHL	1	1	1	2	0	18	1	3	4	61
1999–00	Mobile Mysticks	ECHL	4	0	2	2	39	—	—	—	—	—
1999–00	Grand Rapids Griffins	IHL	51	9	10	19	301	8	0	2	2	24
2000–01	Grand Rapids Griffins	IHL	78	15	21	36	354	10	2	2	4	22
2001–02	Ottawa Senators	NHL	72	10	7	17	231	12	0	0	0	12
2002–03	Ottawa Senators	NHL	68	6	4	10	147	15	1	0	1	24
2003–04	Ottawa Senators	NHL	82	8	8	16	194	7	0	1	1	19
2004–05	Durham Thundercats	WOAA	1	0	1	1	0	—	—	—	—	—
2004–05	Binghamton Senators	AHL	22	4	6	10	132	6	1	1	2	26
2005–06	Ottawa Senators	NHL	79	16	17	33	204	4	1	0	1	6
2006–07	Ottawa Senators	NHL	82	12	16	28	177	20	2	2	4	20
2007–08	Ottawa Senators	NHL	68	6	14	20	199	4	0	1	1	22
2008–09	Ottawa Senators	NHL	60	3	7	10	146	—	—	—	—	—
2009–10	Ottawa Senators	NHL	68	10	12	22	175	6	3	1	4	20
2010–11	Ottawa Senators	NHL	80	6	10	16	210	—	—	—	—	—
2011–12	Ottawa Senators	NHL	72	13	15	28	178	7	2	1	3	22
2012–13	Ottawa Senators	NHL	48	4	8	12	144	10	0	4	4	39
2013–14	Ottawa Senators	NHL	76	8	6	14	211	—	—	—	—	—
2014–15	Ottawa Senators	NHL	38	4	3	7	78	2	0	0	0	0
2015–16	Ottawa Senators	NHL	80	5	8	13	165	—	—	—	—	—
2016–17	Ottawa Senators	NHL	53	1	3	4	63	2	0	0	0	12
NHL totals			1,026	112	138	250	2,522	95	9	10	19	204

== See also ==
- List of NHL players with 1,000 games played
- List of NHL players with 2,000 career penalty minutes
- List of NHL players who spent their entire career with one franchise
