= Grey Highlands =

- Municipality (lower-tier)
- Municipality of Grey Highlands
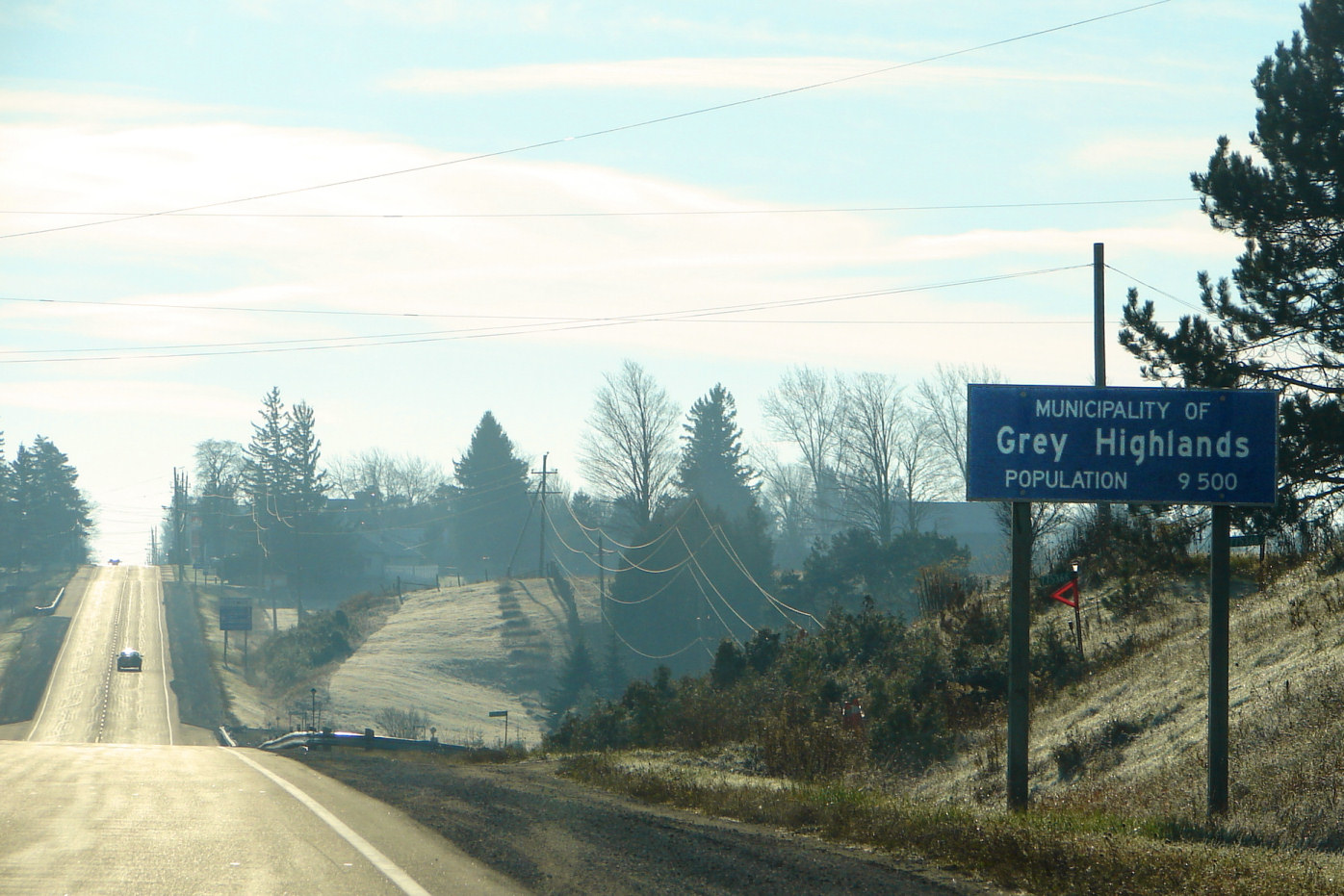

- Location within Grey County Location within Southern Ontario
- Coordinates: 44°20′N 80°30′W
- Country: Canada
- Province: Ontario
- County: Grey
- Formed: January 1, 2001

Government
  - Mayor: Paul McQueen
  - Deputy Mayor: Dane Nielsen
  - Fed. riding: Bruce—Grey—Owen Sound
  - Prov. riding: Bruce—Grey—Owen Sound

Area
  - Land: 879.03 km^{2} (339.40 sq mi)

Population (2021)
  - Total: 10,424
  - Density: 11.9/km^{2} (31/sq mi)
- Time zone: UTC-5 (EST)
  - Summer (DST): UTC-4 (EDT)
- Postal Code: N0C 1H0
- Area codes: 519, 226
- Website: www.greyhighlands.ca

Grey Highlands is a municipality in the southeast corner of Grey County, Ontario, Canada.

It was formed on January 1, 2001, by the amalgamation of the Village of Markdale and the Townships of Artemesia, Euphrasia and Osprey, which included the unincorporated hamlets of Eugenia, Ceylon, Maxwell, Singhampton, Priceville, Kimberley, Badjeros, and Feversham. The former village of Flesherton is also located within the municipality and was amalgamated with Artemesia Township in 1998.

== Geography ==
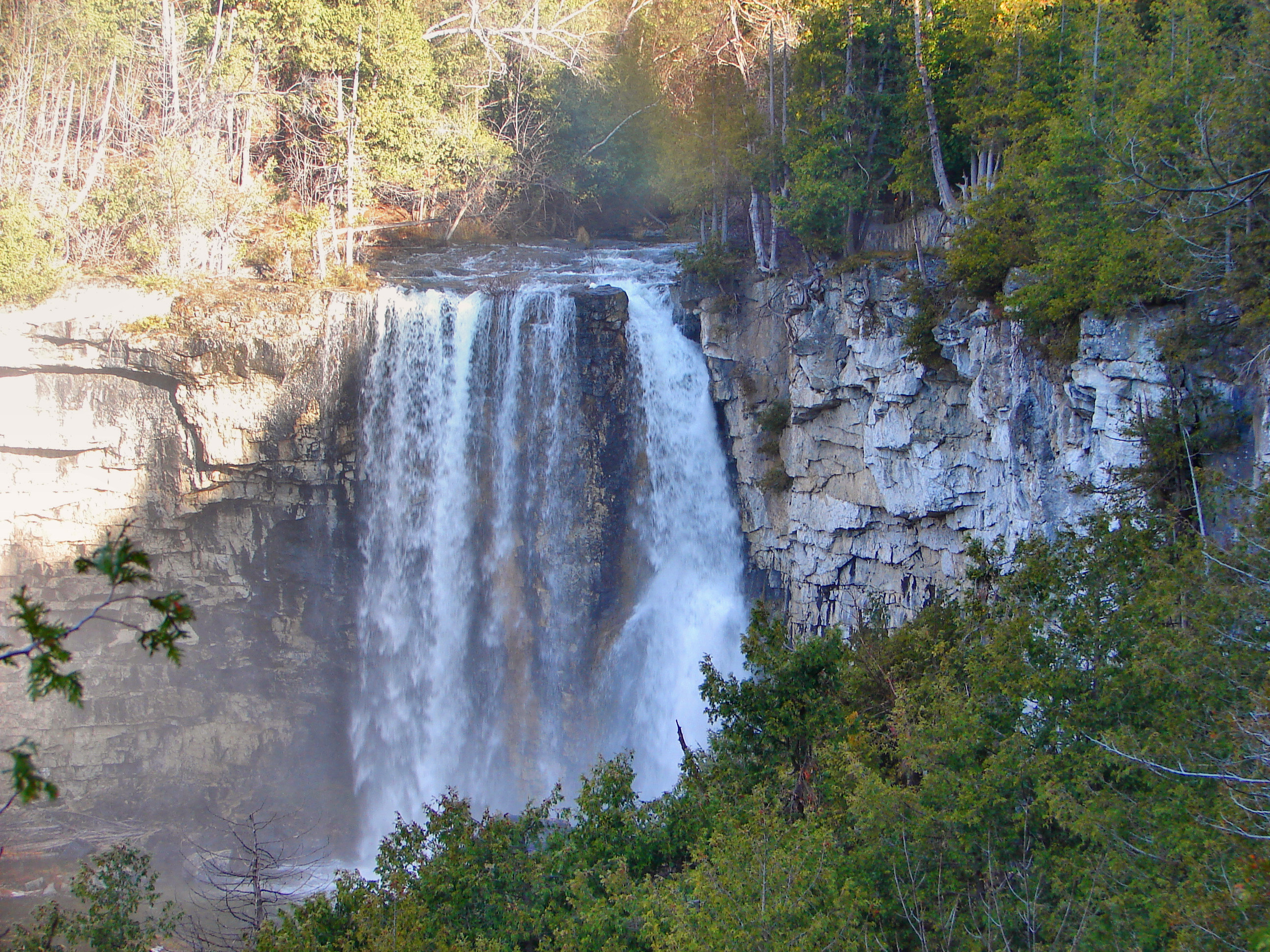
Eugenia Falls

The dominant natural feature of the area is the Niagara Escarpment, which passes through the municipality and has several ancillary features:

- the Bruce Trail, a popular hiking and multi-use trail, follows the brow of the Niagara Escarpment.
- Beaver Valley, a steep-sided and broad valley, was created during the last ice age. The eastern side of the valley, as part of the Niagara Escarpment, was designated a UNESCO Biosphere reserve in 1990. The west side of the valley is home to a number of downhill ski slopes, including Beaver Valley Ski Club.
- Eugenia Falls, where the Beaver River crosses the Niagara Escarpment, is the location of Grey County's only gold rush.

=== Communities ===
- Eugenia
- Feversham (/ˈfiːvərzəm/)
- Flesherton
- Kimberley
- Markdale
- Vandeleur

== Demographics ==
In the 2021 Census of Population conducted by Statistics Canada, Grey Highlands had a population of 10,424 living in 4,091 of its 5,337 total private dwellings, a change of 6.3% from its 2016 population of 9,804. With a land area of 879.03 km^{2} (339.40 sq mi), it had a population density of 11.9/km^{2} (30.7/sq mi) in 2021.

In the 2016 census, the municipality covered a land area of 882 square kilometres (341 sq mi) and had a population of 9,804. The municipality had a healthy population growth, and its average age (43 years old) is close to that of the provincial average (41 years old). The average household size was 2.5, and the average total income of all households is $94,000. The average after-tax income of households in the municipality was $77,000.

Historical census populations – Grey Highlands

Year	Pop.	±%
1996	8,620	—
2001	9,196	+6.7%
2006	9,480	+3.1%

Year	Pop.	±%
2011	9,520	+0.4%
2016	9,804	+3.0%
2021	10,424	+6.3%

Population counts are not adjusted for boundary changes.
Source: Statistics Canada

== Education ==
Elementary students (kindergarten to grade 8) are divided into three catchment areas:

- MacPhail Memorial Elementary School serves the Flesherton area.
- Osprey Central School serves the Maxwell and the Feversham areas.
- Beavercrest Community School serves the Markdale and the surrounding areas.

All of those students go to Grey Highlands Secondary School in Flesherton for Grades 9 to 12.

== See also ==
- List of townships in Ontario
