= Grey East (federal electoral district) =

Former federal electoral district in Ontario, Canada

Ontario electoral district

Defunct federal electoral district
- Legislature: House of Commons
- District created: 1872
- District abolished: 1914
- First contested: 1872
- Last contested: 1911

Grey East was a federal electoral district represented in the House of Commons of Canada from 1872 to 1917. It was located in the province of Ontario. This riding was created in 1872 from parts of Grey North and Grey South ridings.

In 1872, the County of Grey was divided into three ridings: Grey North, Grey East and Grey South.

The East Riding consisted of the Townships of Proton, Melancthon, Osprey, Artemisia, Collingwood, Euphrasia and St. Vincent. In 1882, the riding was redefined to exclude the township or Artemesia, and include the village of Shelburne and the town of Meaford.

In 1903, The east riding was redefined to consist of the townships of Artemesia, Collingwood, Euphrasia, Holland, Osprey and Proton, the town of Thornbury, and the villages of Dundalk and Markdale.

The electoral district was abolished in 1914 when it was redistributed between Grey North and Grey Southeast ridings.

== Members of Parliament ==
This riding has elected the following members of Parliament:

Parliament	Years	Member	Party
Riding created from Grey North and Grey South
2nd	1872–1874	William Kingston Flesher	Conservative
3rd	1874–1878	William Kingston Flesher	Conservative
4th	1878–1882	Thomas Simpson Sproule	Conservative
5th	1882–1887	Thomas Simpson Sproule	Conservative
6th	1887–1891	Thomas Simpson Sproule	Conservative
7th	1891–1896	Thomas Simpson Sproule	Conservative
8th	1896–1900	Thomas Simpson Sproule	Conservative
9th	1900–1904	Thomas Simpson Sproule	Conservative
10th	1904–1908	Thomas Simpson Sproule	Conservative
11th	1908–1911	Thomas Simpson Sproule	Conservative
12th	1911–1917	Thomas Simpson Sproule	Conservative
Riding dissolved into Grey Southeast and Grey North

== Election results ==
1872 Canadian federal election
Party	Candidate	Votes
Conservative	William Kingston Flesher	1,402
Unknown	R. McKnight	857
Source: Canadian Elections Database

1874 Canadian federal election
Party	Candidate	Votes
Conservative	William Kingston Flesher	1,566
Unknown	R. McKnight	1,121

1878 Canadian federal election
Party	Candidate	Votes
Conservative	Thomas Simpson Sproule	1,664
Unknown	A. Gifford	1,133

1882 Canadian federal election
Party	Candidate	Votes
Conservative	Thomas Simpson Sproule	1,934
Unknown	Peter Christie	1,520

1887 Canadian federal election
Party	Candidate	Votes
Conservative	Thomas Simpson Sproule	2,400
Liberal	Robert Gilray	1,845

1891 Canadian federal election
Party	Candidate	Votes
Conservative	Thomas Simpson Sproule	1,977
Liberal	John Clark	1,958

1896 Canadian federal election
Party	Candidate	Votes
Conservative	Thomas S. Sproule	2,560
Patrons of Industry	James Bowes	2,039

1900 Canadian federal election
Party	Candidate	Votes
Conservative	T. S. Sproule	2,707
Liberal	C. W. Hartman	2,342

1904 Canadian federal election
Party	Candidate	Votes
Conservative	Thos S. Sproule	2,209
Liberal	Clayton W. Hartman	1,527

1908 Canadian federal election
Party	Candidate	Votes
Conservative	Thomas Simpson Sproule	2,396
Liberal	Elzear Raymond	1,260

1911 Canadian federal election
Party	Candidate	Votes
Conservative	Thomas Simpson Sproule	2,560
Liberal	Clayton Webb Hartman	1,475

== See also ==
- List of Canadian electoral districts
- Historical federal electoral districts of Canada
