= Craigleith Heritage Depot =

Former railroad station-turned-community hub

Craigleith
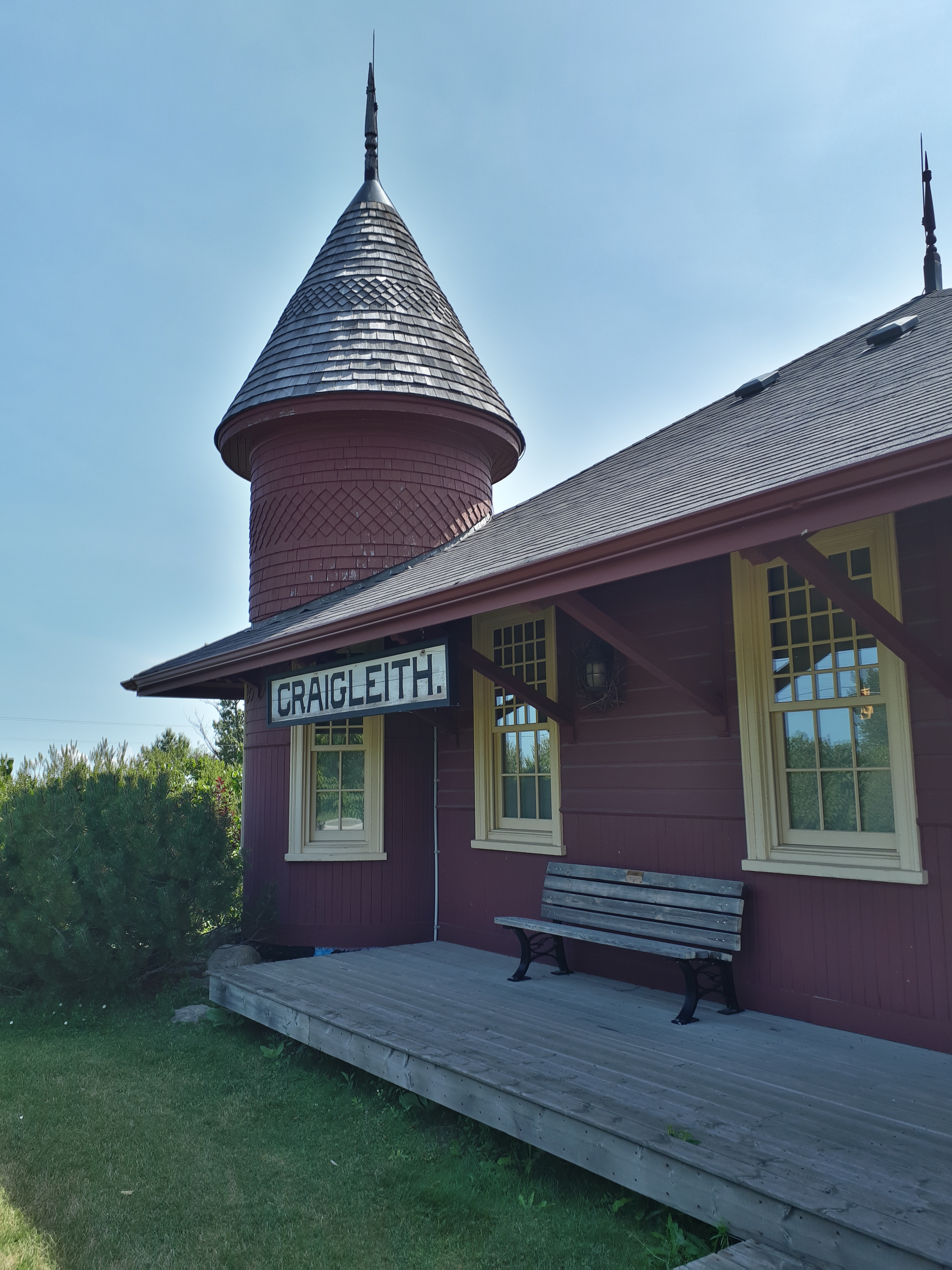
- View of the depot, with the tower

General information
- Location: 113 Lakeshore Road; The Blue Mountains, Ontario
- Coordinates: 44°31′30″N 80°19′31″W

Former services
| Preceding station | Canadian National Railway | Following station |
|---|---|---|
| Camperdown toward Meaford | Meaford – Allandale | Collingwood toward Allandale |
Location

The Craigleith Heritage Depot is a museum, library, tourism and community hub serving The Blue Mountains, Ontario in partnership with The Town of The Blue Mountains Public Library and is the last remaining station standing on Canada's first long-line railroad. It is located on the corner of Highway 26 and Grey Road 19 on the south side of Georgian Bay. Erected in the 1880s, the Craigleith Heritage Depot was originally a train station called Craigleith Station, then a restaurant called The Depot, currently it is a museum and an adjoined public library. Displays in the museum showcase the history of the Petun First Nations, Craigleith Station, Blue Mountain Pottery, the Township of Collingwood, the Mary Ward (ship), fossils found in Craigleith, the local apple industry, Craigleith Oil Works, Osler Castle, local war memorabilia, and old newspaper articles. Some of the many exhibits currently in storage include Canada's largest private collection of railroad documents and one of the world's largest cigar-band collections.

== History ==
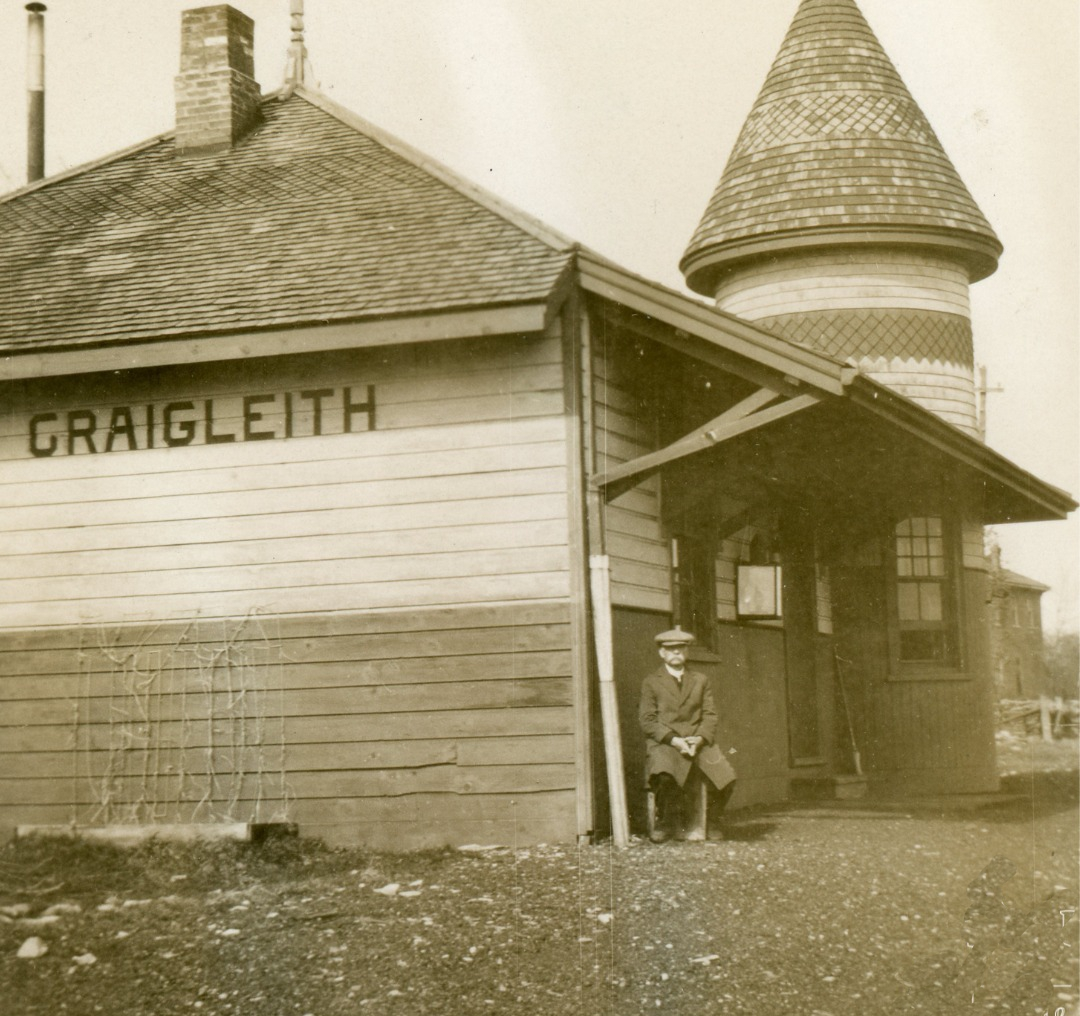
View of the depot, circa 1900

=== Train station ===
The Northern Railway of Canada acquired the parcel of land that The Craigleith Heritage Depot currently occupies from Sandford and Andrew Fleming in 1872. Sandford Fleming was one of the chief surveyors for the railway and he persuaded his father Andrew Fleming to donate the 9.8 acres (0.040 km^{2}) to the railway. The lot is located on a Native trail surveyed by Charles Rankin in 1834. By September 1872, the Collingwood to Meaford branch of the Northern Railway (aka the North Grey Extension Company, or North Grey Railway) was operating, and by 1881, five trains were arriving at Craigleith's platform stop each day.

In 1882, the Northern Railway company was purchased by the Grand Trunk Railway. The Craigleith Station building was constructed from local timber and included at the time a modern feature in railway design, the rounded turret. There are only two turreted stations left in Ontario, with Craigleith being the only one in its original state. The station's dwelling and waiting room was constructed in 1889 with sill foundation, shingle roof, frame and dimensions 26 ft (7.9 m) by 28 ft (8.5 m), height 12 ft (3.7 m). The addition's diameters were 12.5 ft (3.8 m) by 26 ft (7.9 m), height 8 ft (2.4 m). The tower was 8 ft (2.4 m) diameter, height 17 ft (5.2 m). The shed was 12 ft (3.7 m) by 20 ft (6.1 m), height 9 ft (2.7 m). In 1898, the stable was built with frame, shingle roof and dimensions of 12 ft (3.7 m) by 16 ft (4.9 m), height 12 ft (3.7 m). The addition was 17 ft (5.2 m) by 12 ft (3.7 m), height 7 ft (2.1 m) with a 1,680 ft^{2} (156 m^{2}) platform constructed in 1898. Inside the station there were separate waiting rooms for men and women as well as living quarters for the stationmaster and his family. The train conductor lived on site with his wife and family.

In 1860, Edward VII, son of Queen Victoria, travelled to Canada for a visit. Almost every station between Toronto and Collingwood had erected spectacular floral arches beneath which the prince passed in his open observation car. In 1974 when a special excursion of hundreds of railway fans retraced the route taken by the prince, a member of the planning committee suggested a revival of the floral arches, however only Craigleith decided to put up the arches. In an attempt to hold back the lilac blossoms, they were stored in a local apple storage plant. On the evening before the train trip, post diggers went to work to dig holes for the arches and accidentally severed the cable which controlled the railway signals for miles. Warning bells and red lights went out of control for the next 12 hours. In addition, a heavy rainstorm during the night destroyed the Lilac Arch. No towns have been persuaded to participate in the revival of the floral arch since.

Phillis Gertrude Wilson was born at the depot in 1909. Her grandfather was the track master George Wilson. Helen Speck Gibson was also born at the depot on February 23, 1922, when her father, Alan Speck was the stationmaster. In the 1960s, Dr. Sandford Goodchild used the depot as a cottage and after rail service ended, the station was purchased by a former mayor of Collingwood who also used it as a cottage for many years.

Presently hung on the wall is an original document from the General Roadmaster dated May 6, 1902, outlining the wages of the railway station workers. The foreman at the Depot received $45.00 per month. All regular section laborers received $1.20 per day. The foreman rates covered all services performed, there was no allowance for overtime.

=== Tourism ===
The ski industry was one of the businesses which benefited by the railway stop. In the 1940s, ski facilities were opened to the public, along with the creation of private ski facilities. Skiers could take a 7:00am train from Union Station to Craigleith Station, then board the Weider horse-drawn sleigh for 25 cents which would go right to the ski hill now called Blue Mountain. Father Don Plater drove the sled. The ski train service was suspended in 1942 due to the war effort and shortage of rail transportation. Service to Craigleith Station resumed after World War II in 1947 and continued until the 1960s when transportation by automobile drastically reduced ridership. In 1991, the neighboring railway corridor was secured by the Ontario Trails Council and is now the Georgian Trail.

=== Restaurant ===
In 1966, Ken and Suyrea Knapman purchased and restored the building and opened a restaurant on October 26, 1968, naming it The Depot. On September 23, 1996, the couple were presented the Ontario Heritage Foundation Community Heritage Award by Collingwood Township's Reeve Ross Arthur in recognition of their preservation efforts.

They put The Depot up for sale in 1998 when Mr. Knapman's health problems became serious, but they were determined to find a purchaser who would preserve the building. Ken Knapman died due to heart complications. For two years after, Suyrea struggled to keep the restaurant going, hoping that an investor would come along who was committed to preserving the building.

The Craigleith Heritage Ridge Project and supporters met with the Town of the Blue Mountains council to encourage the town to buy the building. Following the meeting, council attempted to purchase it but wanted only the building and not the rest of the property. Fearing splitting the parcel would result in the remaining land being difficult to sell, the Town could not come to an agreement with Suryea Knapman and she sold the building to Roger Lockhart, who was under no obligation to preserve the historic building. Lockhart applied for rezoning and severances of the depot's land. The application was approved and the land was severed into four blocks of land just east of the depot for building lots.

=== Museum ===
In 2001, with the support of the Craigleith Heritage Committee and many concerned citizens, the Craigleith Depot was purchased by the Town of the Blue Mountains for $380,000, with $350,000 being contributed by the municipality and Craigleith Heritage Committee, and $30,000 by the Blue Mountain Watershed Trust. In September 2001, a Visibility Strategy was undertaken and presented to the Town of the Blue Mountains regarding what was to become of the Craigleith Depot. The successful option was to turn The Depot into a heritage centre and trailhead with a commercial component. The Craigleith Heritage Committee and Blue Mountain Watershed Trust undertook many years of fundraising to ensure the building could be fully restored and reopened to the public as The Craigleith Heritage Depot Community Interpretation Centre.

The building has kept the original flooring from the train station. It is evident on this flooring where visitors and travelers have frequently walked.

=== Library ===
The Craigleith Heritage Depot joined with the Town of the Blue Mountains Public Library in 2016. The decision to unite the museum with the library was controversial.

There is an ongoing project at the Craigleith Heritage Depot called Then and Now, it includes images and video of local history, including an interview with Mrs. Helen Speck Gibson who was born in the Craigleith Railway Station as her father was the station master.

== The Lilac Bushes ==
Outside the railway station there are Lilacs from the local Fleming's farm, it is believed they were brought here from Scotland by the Fleming family.

Planted in 1901 by Stationmaster Wilson's wife, the lilacs have become a signature of the depot. Some say the lilacs were planted there because Wilson's wife was congratulating him on the job of station agent, some say they were there to cover the smell of the outhouses outside the train station, some say they were given as a gift, others say they were planted to remind her of her native Britain. Either way the stationmaster's wife, Phylis Wilson, went to get the original lilac roots and planted them.

The lilacs took off impeccably around the depot. They were cared for by the stationmasters and the Knapmans, who provided cuttings to those who wanted to take some home lilacs home without hurting the bushes. The Depot restaurant has also put on a two-week Lilac Festival.

The lilacs at the depot have since become an Ontario landmark, and the road immediately south of the depot is now called Lilac Lane.

== Heritage Protection ==
The building has been protected under Part IV of the Ontario Heritage Act, so designated by the Town of the Blue Mountains since 2003. The Notice of Intention to Designate the building notes "The property is considered for designation under Part IV of the Ontario Heritage Act, chapter 0.18, R.S.O. 1990, as amended, as representing both an historical site and as a substantially original example of late 19th century rail road station architecture. An original settler of Craigleith, Andrew Grieg Fleming, father of Sandford Fleming, donated land for a railway station and right-of-way in Craigleith, and it is believed the Craigleith Station was built in about 1878. Sandford Fleming went on to a career as a railway construction engineer, and as well developed the program of Standard Time in use today. The site includes a still thriving stand of lilacs, known throughout the area, thought originally imported from Scotland and planted by the Fleming family. Following steady rail and Station service, including the famous ski trains that helped develop the area ski industry and as recognized by the Canadian Ski Museum, passenger rail service was terminated in 1960."
