= Hike Ontario =

Hike Ontario is a non-profit organization founded in 1974 devoted to promote hiking and walking activities in Ontario, Canada. Its headquarters are in Mississauga, and it was previously based at The Gate House of the Seneca College King Campus in King City.

It is a member of the Ontario Trails Council, which coordinates all trail associations throughout Ontario, including equestrian trails, snowmobile trails, and bicycle trails. Hike Ontario accepts individual and club memberships for a fee. It publishes an electronic newsletter, Trail Mail and a quarterly print newsletter, Hike Ontario.

Hike Ontario also offers a hike leader education program for persons interested in taking groups on hikes. Hike Ontario also is one of the main proponents of Ontario Hike Week. As a provincial organization it is made up of a number of community-based clubs which support both hiking and walking in those communities in which they are based.
