= Gordon Peter Campbell =

Canadian politician (1898–1964)

The Honourable Gordon Peter Campbell

Canadian Senator from Ontario
- In office February 19, 1943 – January 16, 1964
- Nominated by: William Lyon MacKenzie King
- Appointed by: The Earl of Athlone

Personal details
- Born: 3 October 1898 Ridgetown, Ontario, Canada
- Died: 16 January 1964 (aged 65) Toronto, Ontario, Canada
- Spouse: Mary Middleton Garrow (m. 1927)
- Education: Osgoode Hall (LLB)
- Occupation: Politician; lawyer; businessman

Gordon Peter Campbell (3 October 1898 – 16 January 1964) was a Canadian politician, lawyer and businessman.

== Biography ==
A lawyer by profession, he was senior partner at the Toronto firm of Campbell, Godfrey and Lewtas.

Campbell was a senior fundraiser for the Liberal Party of Canada and managed the party's financial affairs during the 1940 federal election.

In the 1930s he founded the Centurian Club, a non-partisan service organization with a mandate to interest young people in politics.

Campbell was born in Ridgetown, Ontario. As a youth, he earned pocket money by working in the general store and operating a dance hall with friends that, on one occasion, featured a young Guy Lombardo conducting the orchestra.

He graduated from Osgoode Hall Law School in 1923 and became a junior partner in the Toronto firm of Arnoldi, Parry and Campbell. He initially focussed on litigation but later switched to corporate and taxation law.

He became particularly involved with maritime law and served as counsel to the Lake Shipping Association and the East Elevators Association. He was one of the first proponents of offshore radio, and recommended that commercial radio stations be established off the coasts of Canada.

In the 1930s, he played a role in the drafting of the Canada Shipping Act of 1934, Canada's first attempt to regulate the shipping industry which had previously been regulated by laws inherited from Britain.

He was named King's Counsel in 1939.

Campbell was appointed to the Senate by William Lyon Mackenzie King in 1943 and sat in the chamber as a Liberal until his death at the age of 65.

Later in his career, Campbell was vice-president of the Canadian Imperial Bank of Commerce and Crown Trust and was president of several shipping firms. He was also a director of Argus Corporation.

He played a role in the development of Collingwood, Ontario as a centre for skiing with his ownership of Blue Mountain Resorts Ltd.
