= Blue Mountain Pottery =

Canadian pottery company, 1953–2004

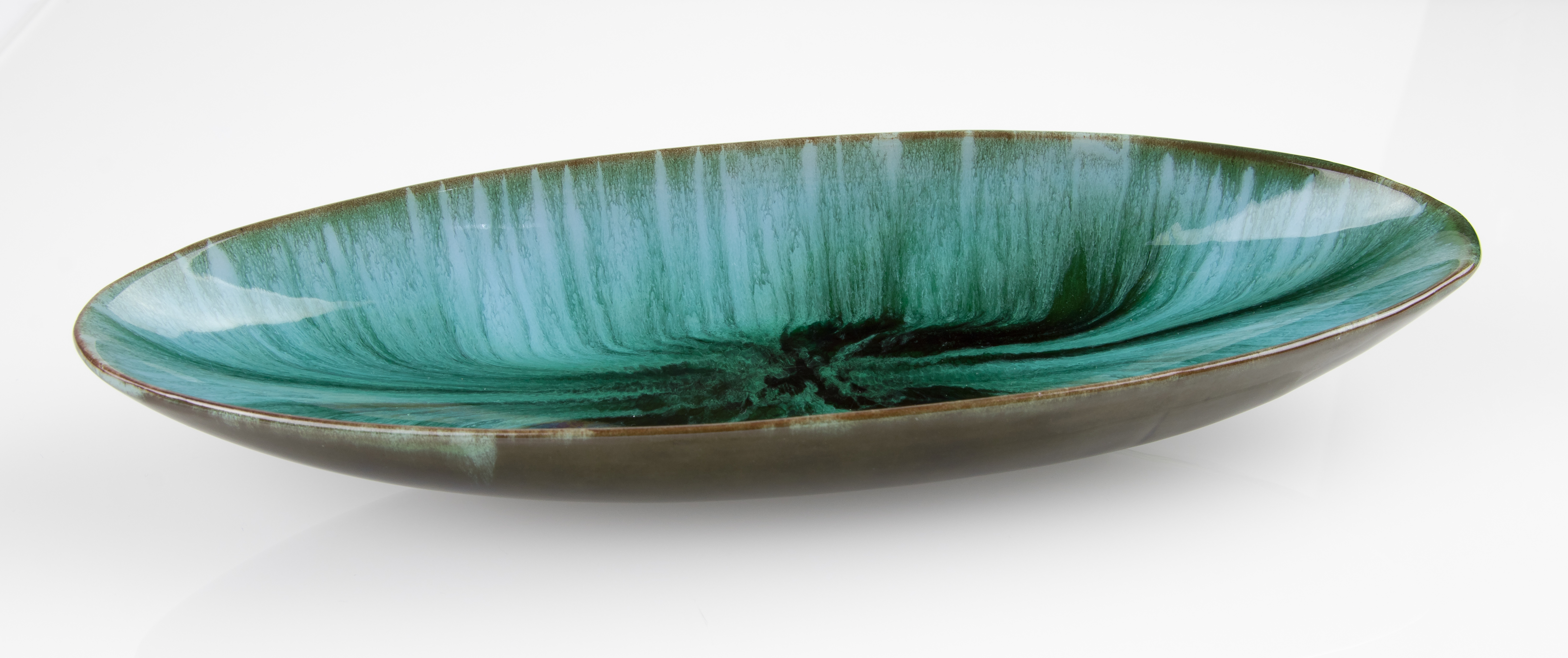
- Oval bowl by Blue Mountain Pottery, with the distinctive blue-green glaze
- Type: Privately held company
- Industry: Ornamental pottery manufacture
- Founded: 1953; 73 years ago in Collingwood, Ontario, Canada
- Founders: Joseph (Jozo) Weider; Dennis Tupy; Mirek Hambalek
- Defunct: December 31, 2004
- Headquarters: Collingwood, Ontario, Canada
- Area served: Product sold across Canada, with exports to the United States, the United Kingdom, Australia and New Zealand
- Key people: Dominic Stanzione; Robert Blair; David Bennett
- Products: Various pottery types, with distinctive multi-coloured glazes

Blue Mountain Pottery was a Canadian pottery company in Collingwood, Ontario, that operated from 1953 to 2004.

Named for the nearby Blue Mountains, it produced pottery with distinctive mixtures of glazes, the most common of which included a blue-green and a dark grey or black glaze. The company’s pottery became popular in Canada in the 1960s and 1970s; it was also exported to the United States, the United Kingdom, Australia, and New Zealand. The pottery is popular among collectors; examples are held by the Royal Ontario Museum and the George R. Gardiner Museum of Ceramic Art.

== Foundation ==
The company was founded in 1953 by Jozo Weider, an immigrant from Czechoslovakia. Two other immigrants from Czechoslovakia, Dennis Tupy and Mirek Hambalek, also played key roles in the early days of the company.

Weider owned the Blue Mountain ski hill in the Blue Mountains near Collingwood. He wanted to provide a line of items for the ski hill's gift store. Tupy, who worked at the ski hill, had European training in ceramics. One day, when a new ski run was being ploughed, he stepped into some heavy clay that had been turned up. Scraping it off his boot, he commented that it resembled the clays he had worked with in Czechoslovakia. Hearing the comment, Weider began to work with Tupy on a pottery project, experimenting with local clays from the Georgian Bay area.

Weider then began Blue Mountain Pottery Ltd. as an offshoot of the ski hill. Tupy worked at the moulds for the products, while Hambalek, who had training in glazing techniques, became the chief glazer for the pottery. They built their own kilns for their product. As the pottery took off, it provided an income stream that kept the Blue Mountain ski hill afloat during the summers. The pottery was originally located in a building on the ski hill, but then expanded to a location in Craigleith, and finally to a factory in Collingwood.

== Products ==
"When we put pottery under high heat and used drip glazes, they produced a variegated pattern. No batch was entirely the same because they reacted differently. The items had an individuality about them. That was part of the charm. You were really buying a piece of Blue Mountain."

— George Weider, son of Joseph Weider

Blue Mountain Pottery were known for their combinations of glazes that gave each item a unique finish. The initial glaze used was a deep blue-green, combined with a darker glaze. This combination of glazes, called a "flow glaze" or a "drip glaze" process, meant that during the firing process, each piece obtained a unique appearance.

The company developed a particular combination of glazes, with light colours mixed with dark. The most iconic was a blue-green glaze, with an additional dark grey or black glaze. These colours were said to have been inspired by the evergreen trees which grew on the Blue Mountains. However, they also experimented with many other glaze combinations, such as harvest gold, cobalt blue, mocha, pewter, red, brown, and white.

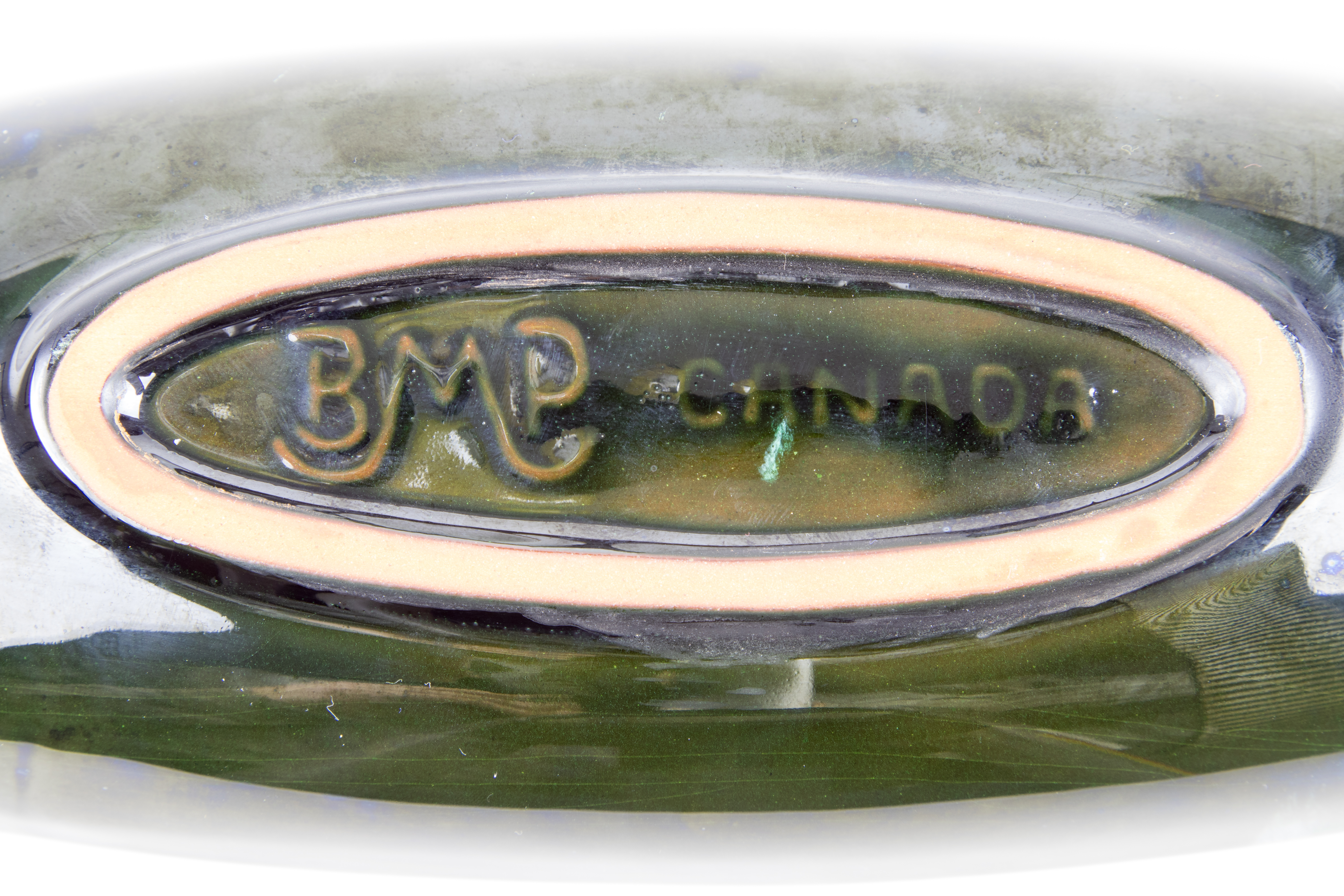
Logo on the bowl's bottom

Production of the red clay items with the distinctive glazing started in 1953–1954. The company went on to produce various types of pottery, from animal figurines to jugs, pots, and vases. One specialty item was a mug commemorating the Canadian Centennial in 1967. All of their products had the "BMP Canada" logo on the underside.

The company initially sold its products in Ontario, but expanded, first across Canada, and then internationally. Blue Mountain pottery was very popular in Canada in the 1960s and 1970s, often as wedding gifts. The company also expanded into the export trade, with sales to the United States, the United Kingdom, Australia, New Zealand and the Caribbean. At one point, sixty per cent of the company's sales were for export, with two-thirds of those sales being to the United States.

== Later years and closing ==
Tupy worked with the company until 1960. Dominic Stanzione became the studio potter, who helped expand the company and the popularity of its wares in the 1960s, particularly with large pieces made on a potter's wheel. Starting in 1982, David Bennett was the master mould maker and designer with the company.

Weider sold the company in 1968, to allow him to focus on developing the Blue Mountain ski resort. Blue Mountain Pottery was acquired by International Silver Company of Canada. From 1971 onwards, the lead manager was Robert Blair. In 1987, when International Silver went into receivership, Blair bought the Blue Mountain assets, including the moulds, and maintained operations.

The company finally closed on December 31, 2004, unable to compete with cheap imports. At its peak, it had been one of Canada's largest potteries.

== Legacy ==
The Royal Ontario Museum has a large collection of Blue Mountain pottery, including both decorative and functional pieces, and one of the Centennial mugs. Many of the pieces are in the classic blue-green glaze, but there are also pieces in other glazes, showing the range of experimentation in the pottery studio. The collection includes donations made by members of the Blue Mountain Pottery Collectors Club in 2003, and also donations from Robert Blair, the last president of Blue Mountain Pottery, in 2005.

The George R. Gardiner Museum of Ceramic Art in Toronto also has a collection of Blue Mountain pottery.

Canada Post released a commemorative stamp for the Blue Mountain Pottery.

The company's pottery is still widely collected, in Canada and worldwide, resulting in the formation of the Blue Mountain Pottery Collectors Club, made up of private collectors. The price of Blue Mountain pieces has steadily risen, especially in Britain. One particular set was a Noah's Ark, thirteen figurines on wooden stands, plus the Ark itself. One complete set sold for $7,000, prior to 2014.

In July 2022, the Craigleith Heritage Depot, the Blue Mountains Public Library, and the Blue Mountain Pottery Collectors Club put on a weekend retrospective of the Blue Mountain Pottery, at the Beaver Valley Community Centre in Thornbury, Ontario. The retrospective included a sales floor, exhibits of pottery from local museums, and displays about the history of pottery. Pottery experts, former employees of Blue Mountain Pottery, and Conrad Biernacki, author of an upcoming book on Blue Mountain Pottery, all attended. There was also the premiere of a documentary, entitled Blue Clay. The documentary was shown again two years later at a local film fest.
