= Ontario Trails Council =

Charity supporting recreational trails in Ontario

The Ontario Trails Council (OTC) (French: Conseil de Sentiers de l'Ontario) is a charitable organization which promotes the management, use, preservation and development of recreational trails and trail based activity, in Ontario, Canada.

== Membership ==
The Ontario Trails Council has over 200 organizational members, made up of conservation authorities, trail user groups (such as the Ontario Federation of Snowmobile Clubs, Hike Ontario, Ontario Recreational Canoe and Kayak Association, Ontario Equestrian Federation), municipal park and recreation departments, economic development offices, regional tourism organizations (such as Explorers Edge and RTO1), as well as a number of non-governmental trail groups such as The Georgian Bay Coast Trail and the Kinghorn Trail Association. Other members include biospheres and Ontario Government agencies such as the Niagara Parks Commission. The Council's membership represents the broad range of stakeholders involved in Ontario's more than 80,000 kilometres (50,000 mi) of trail. Members of the Ontario Trails Council hold a special place amongst members of Ontario's outdoor recreation community. Members in good standing are eligible for Ontario Trails Hero, Ontario Trails Professional and Trillium Recreational Trail designations. Ontario Trails operates one of the largest trail awareness and information websites in Canada, with over 1.5 million visitors a year to http://ontariotrails.ca this site is also available on mobile devices as a public service at: http://ontariotrailsmap.com Ontario Trails Council provides professional development education for staff and volunteers, through 3 programs available on-line at Algonquin College. Algonquin College hosts the program and Ontario Trails facilitates the learnings. Ontario Trails also provides in community education through its "Trailhead Ontario" brand. See http://trailheadontario.com Ontario Trails has facilitated over 200 community meetings since 2003. The Ontario Trails Council works to ensure full awareness, education and availability of recreational trails and trail based activity by promoting trails and trail based activity on a variety of social media platforms.

== History ==
The Council was formed in 1976 as a project of the Ontario Ministry of Natural Resources. During the three years before they were disbanded, the Council consulted with and received submissions from over three hundred interested Ontario organizations and presented a report to the provincial government.

The Council was reconstituted in 1991 as a charity. From 1991 to 2001, the OTC was the agent for the Trans Canada Trail in Ontario, responsible for completing the Ontario section of that endeavour. The OTC has also taken an active part in the conversion of abandoned railway roadbeds in Ontario into recreational trails.

Since 2001, the Ontario Trails Council has become the provincial trails association, creating a centralized website, disseminating information about trails to the public, assisting in the design and establishment of the Ontario Trails Strategy, holding an annual conference called "Trailhead Ontario", and creating a provincial trail education program.

The Ontario Trails Council receives support from member organizations, the general public and through project grants from the Ministry of Tourism, Culture and Sport (2013), the Ministry of Natural Resources (2012), and the Ministry of Employment, Economic Development and Infrastructure (2014–15).
