= Blue Mountain (ski resort) =

Alpine ski resort in Ontario, Canada

Blue Mountain Resorts

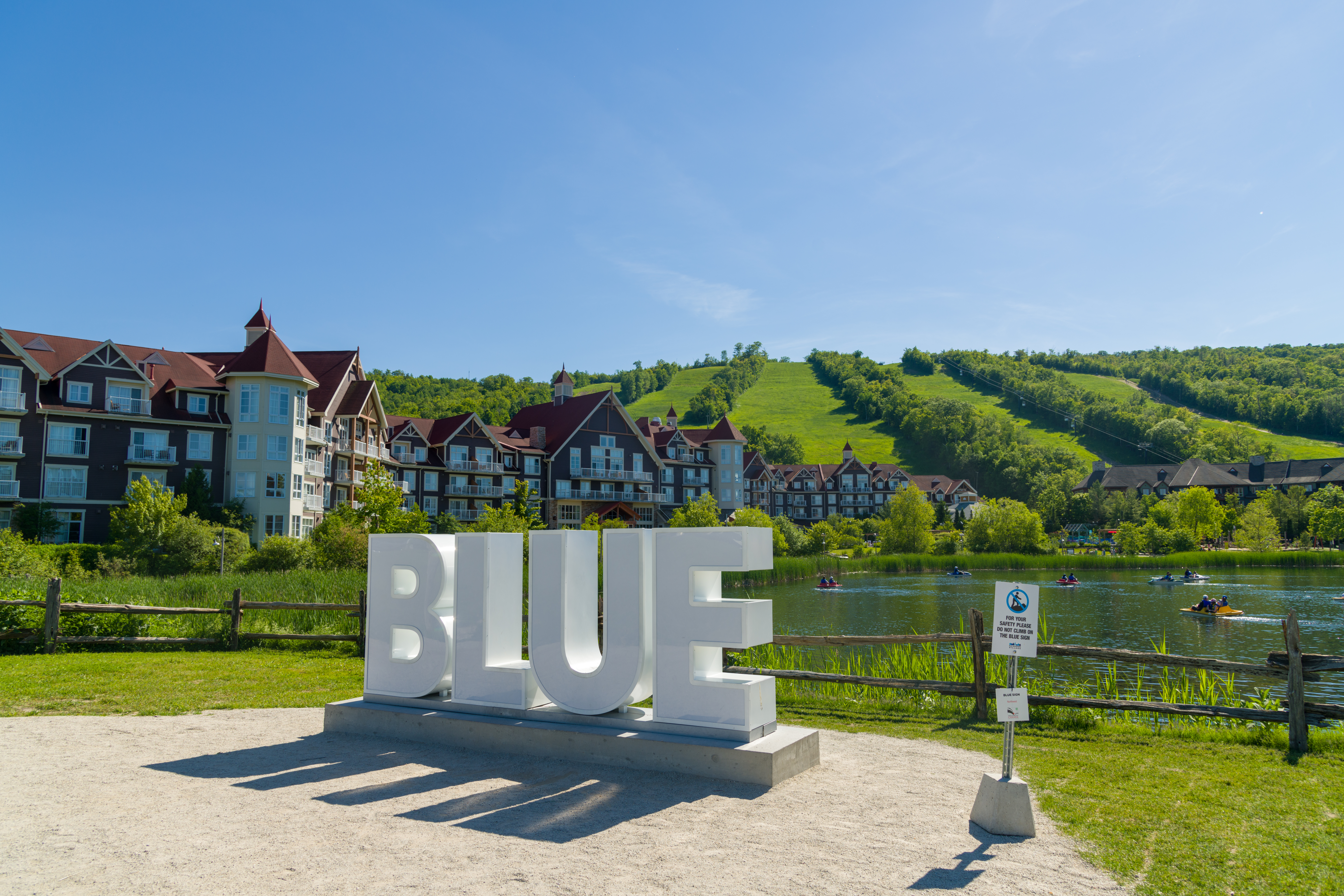

- Location within Southern Ontario
- Location: The Blue Mountains, Ontario Canada
- Mountain: Niagara Escarpment
- Nearest city: Barrie, Ontario, Canada
- Coordinates: 44°30′10″N 80°18′43″W
- Status: Active
- Opened: 1941
- Owner: Alterra Mountain Company
- Vertical: 220 m (720 ft)
- Top elevation: 450 m (1,480 ft)
- Base elevation: 230 m (750 ft)
- Skiable area: 147 ha (360 acres)
- Trails: 43
- Longest run: 1.6 km (1 mi)
- Total length: 35 km (22 mi)
- Lift system: 5 high-speed chairlifts, 2 chairlifts, 4 surface lifts (Note: In addition to chairlifts and surface lifts, the resort also operates an open-air gondola. However, this lift is not used during the resort's skiing season.)
- Lift capacity: 26,750 passengers per hour
- Terrain parks: Yes, 4
- Snowfall: 390 centimetres (154 in)
- Snowmaking: Yes, 145 ha (360 acres)
- Night skiing: Yes
- Website: www.bluemountain.ca

Blue Mountain Resorts is a ski resort located in The Blue Mountains, Ontario, Canada. The resort spans the Niagara Escarpment near the southern shore of Georgian Bay, and encompasses 147 hectares (360 acres) of skiable terrain with a vertical drop of 220 metres (720 ft). As of 2024, the resort maintains 43 named runs, which includes its four terrain parks.

The resort was established in 1941 by Jozo Weider and Gordon Peter Campbell, who acquired land on the escarpment from the Toronto Ski Club and the Blue Mountain Ski Club. In 1948, the resort signed a 999-year lease with the two ski clubs, securing use of their land on the mountain. The resort expanded its winter operations throughout the latter half of the 20th century. By the 1970s, the resort began introducing summer attractions, aiming to become a year-round destination. In 2000, construction began on its resort village, made possible after Intrawest acquired a 50 per cent stake in the company the year prior. In 2017, the resort was acquired by a consortium and consolidated under the Alterra Mountain Company.

The resort hosts several seasonal attractions throughout the year on its slopes and at its resort village at the base of the escarpment. The resort is the third busiest ski resort in Canada after Whistler Blackcomb and Mont Tremblant Resort.

== Etymology ==
The Blue Mountains refers to a portion of the Niagara Escarpment that stretches from Osler Bluff, which overlooks Pretty River Valley Provincial Park, to Georgian Peaks where the escarpment is interrupted by the Beaver Valley. The resort used the Blue Mountain moniker in May 1941 when it was established as Blue Mountain Resorts Limited, although it only occupies parts of the wider Blue Mountains geological range.

The earliest recorded instance of "Blue Mountains" moniker in reference to the area's hills and valleys was in 1819, in John Jeremiah Bigsby's book Shoe and Canoe by Bigsby. However, the "Blue Mountains" moniker is often attributed to Charles Rankin, who referred to the area as the Blue Mountains when surveying the area in 1833. The reason why the "Blue Mountain" moniker was used remains unclear.

Before adopting the "Blue Mountain" name, the area was known as the "Blue Hills," a moniker often associated with Petun country. In the 17th century, Jesuit missionaries also referred to the "Blue Hills" as the "Mountains of St-Jean." However, it is not definitively confirmed that these earlier names specifically refer to the Blue Mountains. Some suggest that the description of the Blue Hills, a hilly area with a village by a lake, could also apply to other Petun settlements in the region.

== History ==
=== Background ===
The area's development as a ski destination began in 1924 with the formation of the Toronto Ski Club. Progress accelerated in 1935 when the Blue Mountain Ski Club, later renamed the Collingwood Ski Club, opened in the area and the first ski trails were developed on the escarpment, Granny, Schuss, and Kandahar, were cut into the Niagara Escarpment.

In 1940, the two ski clubs partnered to purchase 81 hectares (200 acres) of land on the escarpment and hired Herman Smith-Johannsen to assist in the development of the area's ski trails.

=== Establishment ===
In May 1941, Jozo Weider, a Slovak political refugee and chalet builder, partnered with Gordon Peter Campbell, a Toronto-based ski instructor, lawyer and Canadian senator to purchase 3.6 hectares (9 acres) of land from the Toronto Ski Club and Blue Mountain Ski Club, and formed Blue Mountain Resorts Limited. Campbell served as the resort's financier and business advisor, while Jozo Weider held a 25 per cent stake in the resort and was employed as its sports and ski director.

The first ski season began later in 1941, with most visitors arriving by a ski train that departed from Toronto. A barn on the property served as the first ski lodge or "ski barn". The ski train service was briefly discontinued in 1943 due to logistical needs of the Second World War.

In 1948, the resort signed a 999-year lease for the parts of the Niagara Escarpment the ski clubs controlled, in exchange for granting the clubs increased shares in the resort. The next year, an additional 61 hectares (150 acres) of land south of the main ski area was acquired by the resort, and its "ski barn" was renovated to provide après ski entertainment and overnight accommodations.

=== Growth in the latter 20th century ===
A makeshift resort community began to form around Blue Mountain Resorts during the 1950s as frequent visitors built ski cabins near the north end of the resort. In 1953, the Weider opened Blue Mountain Pottery in order to support the resort's finances during the skiing off-season. The resort was also expanded during the 1950s, with a ski jump installed and new trails cut. The resort property was also expanded in 1956, when land at its southern end was purchased.

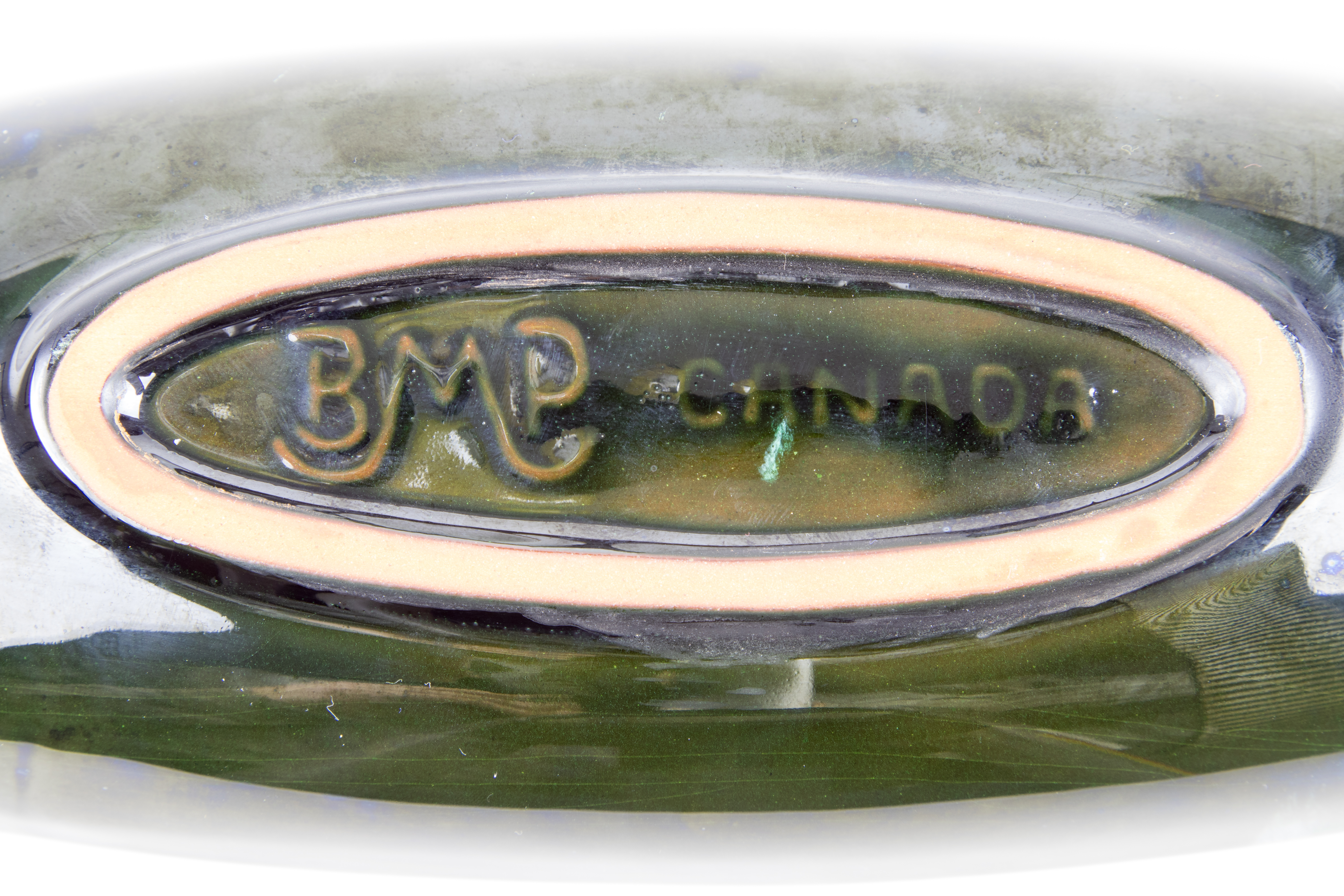
BMP marking on a ceramic bowl to denote its makers, Blue Mountain Pottery. The pottery business was operated by Blue Mountain Resorts from 1953 to 1967 to support the resort's finances during the skiing off-season.

Weider acquired majority ownership of the resort in 1964 with the passing of Campbell in 1964. Blue Mountain Resorts underwent significant expansion during the 1960s, driven by the completion of Highway 400, which improved access to the resort for visitors from the Greater Toronto Area via Highway 26. This included the installation of four chairlift in 1960s, the completion of Blue Mountain Inn in 1963 and the Central Base Lodge in 1969. To finance this development, Weider sold off Blue Mountain Pottery in 1967, although retained the 4.0 hectares (10 acres) of land located across the pottery factory, opting to build a large restaurant, shopping centre and planetarium near the resort.

The resort continued to expand following Weider's death in 1971. During the 1970s, three additional chairlifts were installed, along with the resort's first snowmaking guns and lighting for night skiing.

In 1977, Blue Mountain introduced its first summer attraction, the "Great Slide Ride", featuring two parallel concrete tracks. Additionally, the resort partnered with a private entity to acquire 150 hectares (380 acres) of land for the development of a golf course, which opened in the 1980s as Monterra Golf. Additional summer attractions were added at the resort in the 1980s with the installation of tennis courts, waterslide, and the acquisition of Blue Mountain Beach at Georgian Bay.

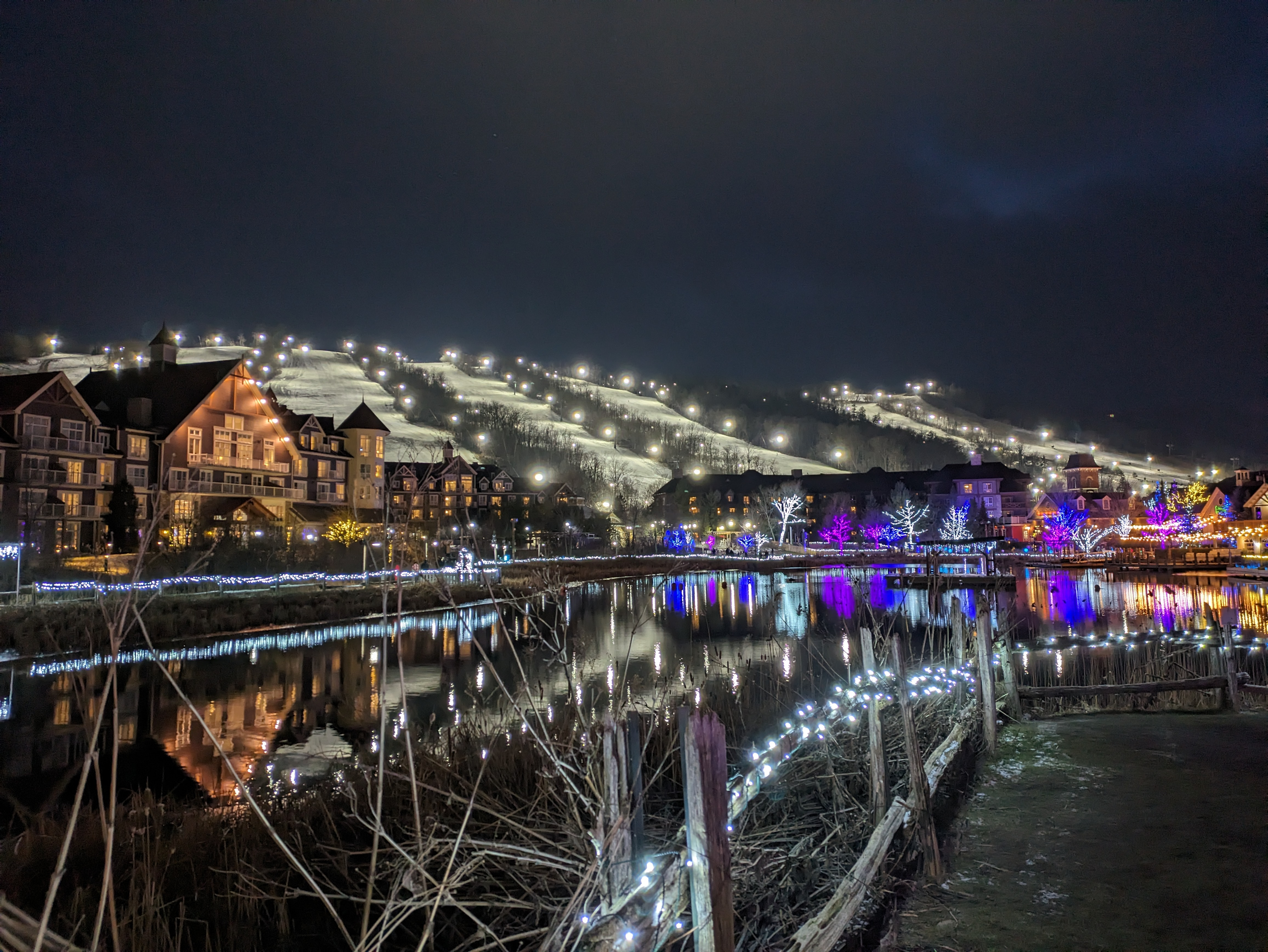
The Blue Mountain Village illuminated at night, with the Blue Mountain ski trails visible in the background

The resorts winter offerings were also expanded during the 1990s, with the opening of its first snow tubing park, the allowance of snowboarding and glade skiing on the resort in the 1990s. In 1999, Intrawest acquired 50 per cent ownership of Blue Mountain Resorts from the Weider family.

=== 21st century ===
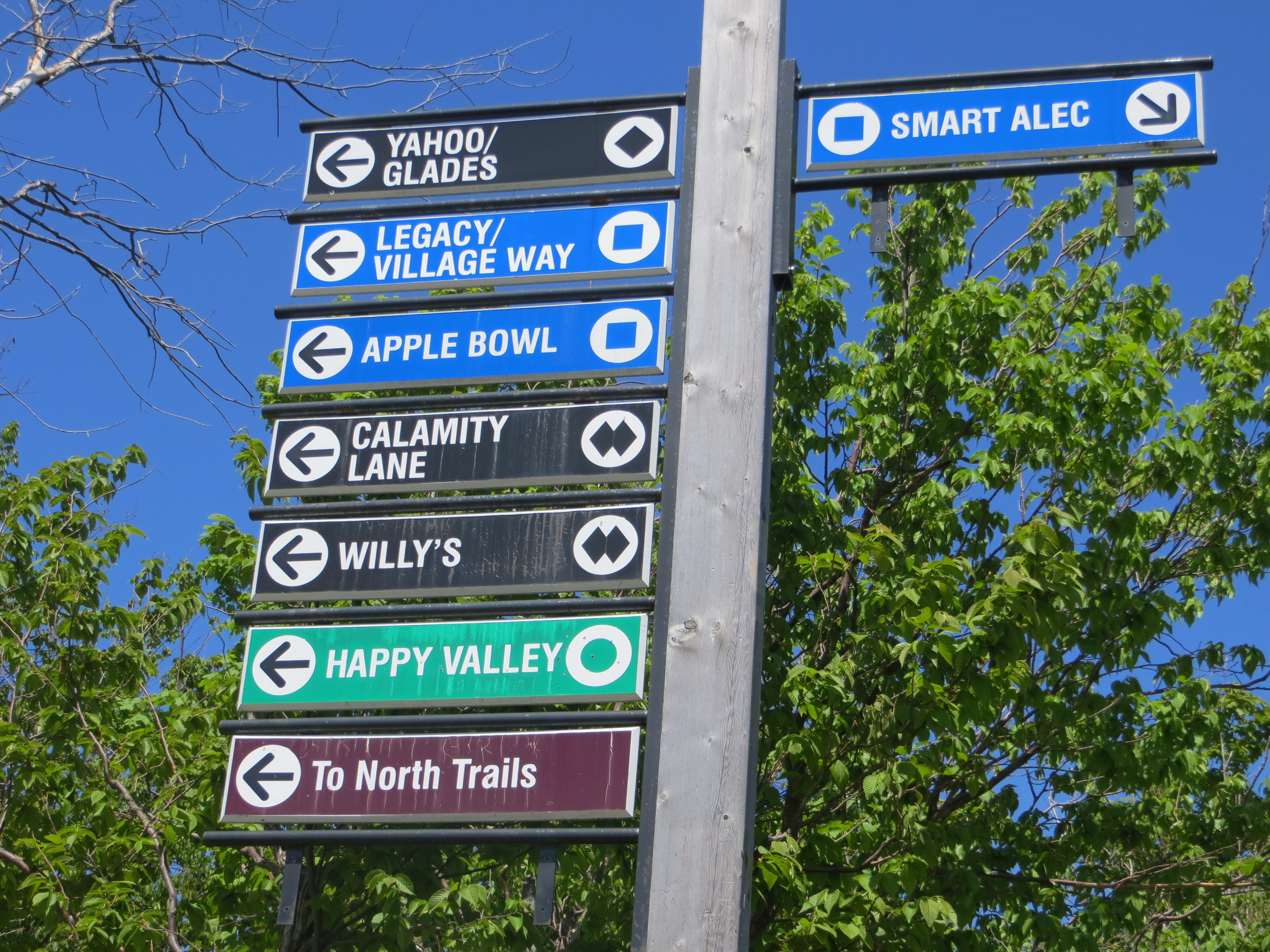
Marker for named ski trails, including their difficulty, on Blue Mountain

In the 2000s, the Blue Mountain began to expand its resort village with the construction of a conference centre, along with several hotels, retail shops and restaurants, and resort homes at Blue Mountain Village. Intraweset's investment in the ski village resulted in 700,000 skier visits by 2006, making Blue Mountain Resort become the third-busiest ski resort in Canada after Whistler Blackcomb and Mont Tremblant Resort. The resort also expanded its summer offerings in the 2000s with the addition of an open-air gondola in 2005, an aquatic centre in 2006, an alpine coaster in 2010, along with a putting green and zip lining.

In February 2013, the resort announced the Orchard section of the mountain would be developed to include six additional runs and a six person high-speed chairlift. Construction began in the spring of 2013 and was completed early in the 2013-2014 ski season, The total cost of the expansion was $10 million. opening to the public in December 2013.

In 2017, KSL Partners and Henry Crown and Company acquired Intrawest and Blue Mountain Resorts in 2017, with the new parent company renamed Alterra Mountain Company in 2018. In 2018, Alterra introduced the Ikon Pass, a season pass granting access to various ski resorts across Canada and the United States, including Blue Mountain.

== Terrain ==
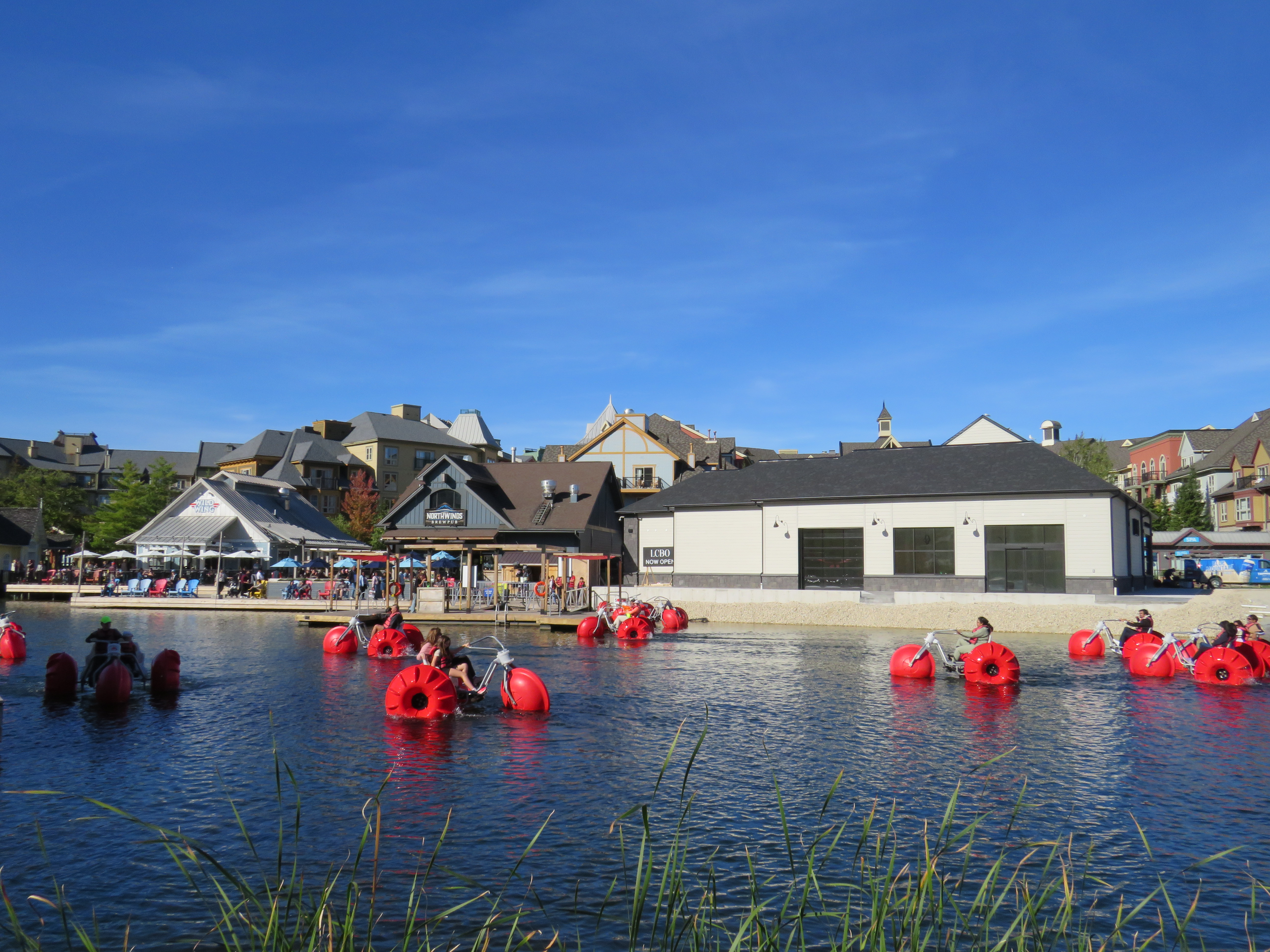
Aqua tricycling at Blue Mountain's Mill Pond is one of several summer activities at the resort

The resort has a skiable area of 147 hectares (360 acres) made up of 43 named ski trails, which includes four terrain parks. Of these name trails, 30 are lit for night skiing. The longest run on the mountain is 1.6 kilometres (0.99 mi), named Gord's Groove.

=== Geography ===
Blue Mountain Resort spans the Niagara Escarpment near the southern shoreline of the Nottawasaga Bay, a southern sub-bay of the Georgian Bay. As opposed to other escarpments, the Niagara Escarpment was not formed from a geological fault, but from the differential erosion of rock strata. Specifically, the area's underlying soft rocks eroded away quickly, which caused the more resistant caprock to break off and created the cliff-life slope. The remaining rock layers formations that form the escarpment includes the Blue Mountain and Queenston Formations.

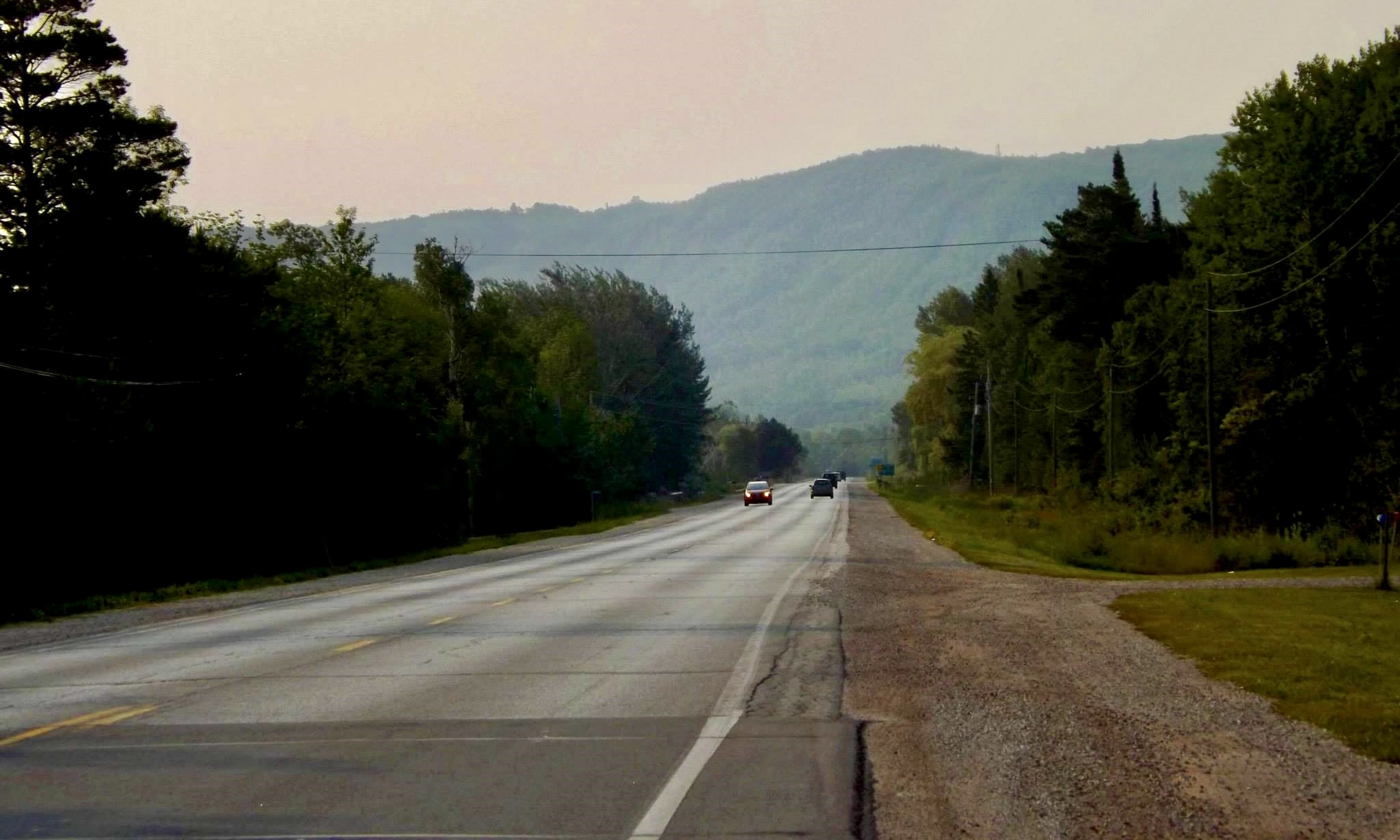
The Blue Mountain portions of the Niagara Escarpment, viewed nearby the base of the escarpment along Ontario Highway 26. The resort spans a portion of the escarpment.

The portion of the escarpment north of Lake Ontario, including its Blue Mountain portions, are formed along the ridge of the Michigan Basin. The Blue Mountain portion of the escarpment intersects the Algonquin Arch, a rise in the bedrock between two saucer-like bedrock depressions that make up the Allegheny and Michigan basins. As a result, the escarpment reaches its highest elevation around the wider Blue Mountain portion of the escarpment, which the resort resides on.

The entire region, including the Blue Mountains, underwent isostatic depression when glaciers covered the region during the Last Glacial Period. As a result, the area rises at a rate of 15 centimetres (5.9 in) every 100 years due to post-glacial rebound. For several thousand years after the Last Glacial Period, the Blue Mountain portions of the escarpment served as the shoreline for the historic Lake Algonquin that was formed from the glacial meltwater.

== Lifts ==
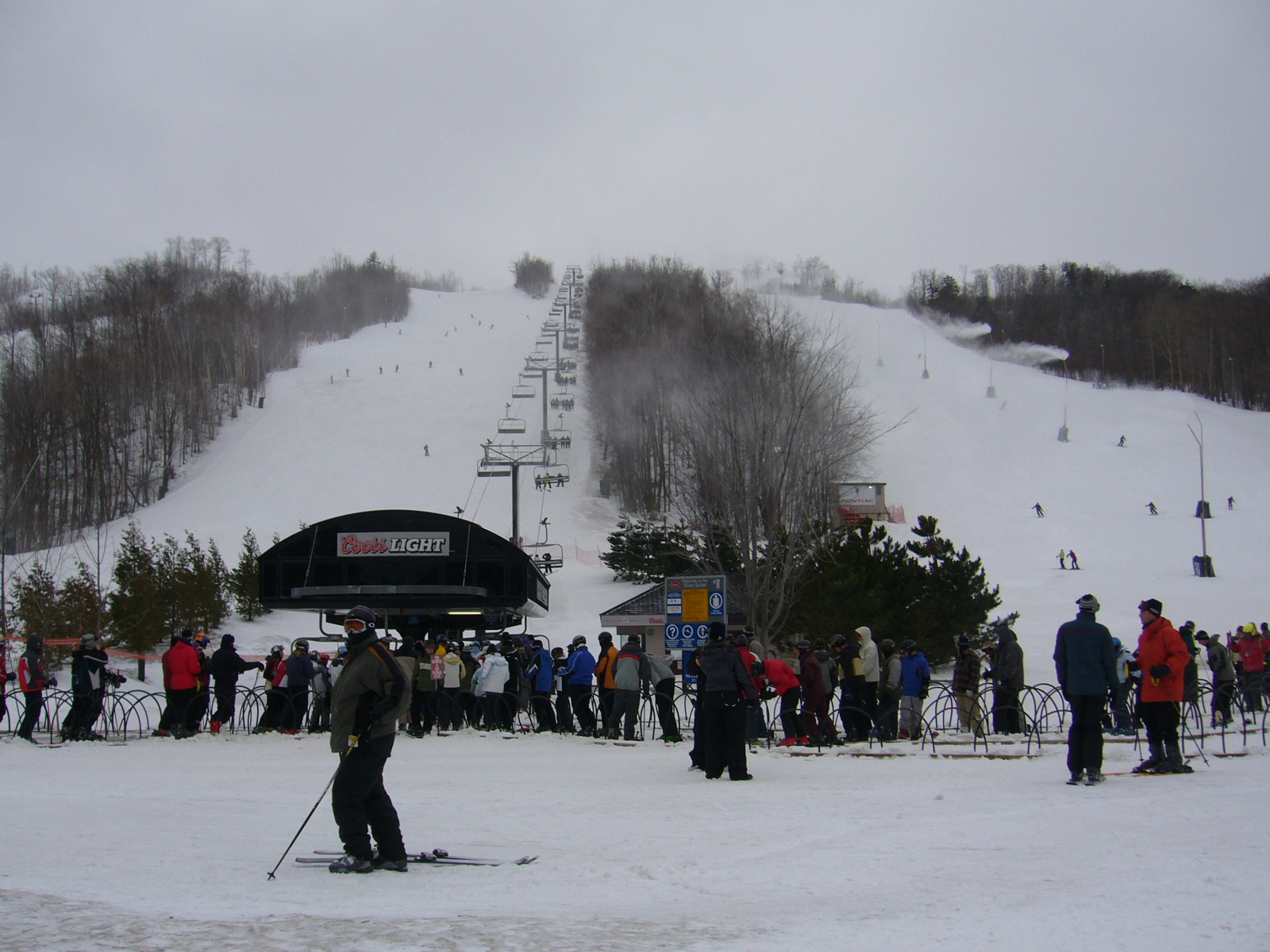
A high-speed six-seat chairlift at the resort, 2006

As of 2024, the resort operates seven chairlifts, four surface lifts, and one open-air gondola lift. The chairlifts at Blue Mountain include five high-speed six-seat chairlifts, one quad chairlift, one triple chairlift, and four surface lifts. This provides the resort with an uphill capacity of 26,750 people per hour. The open-air gondola lift is not used during the winter, and only operates during the skiing off-season.

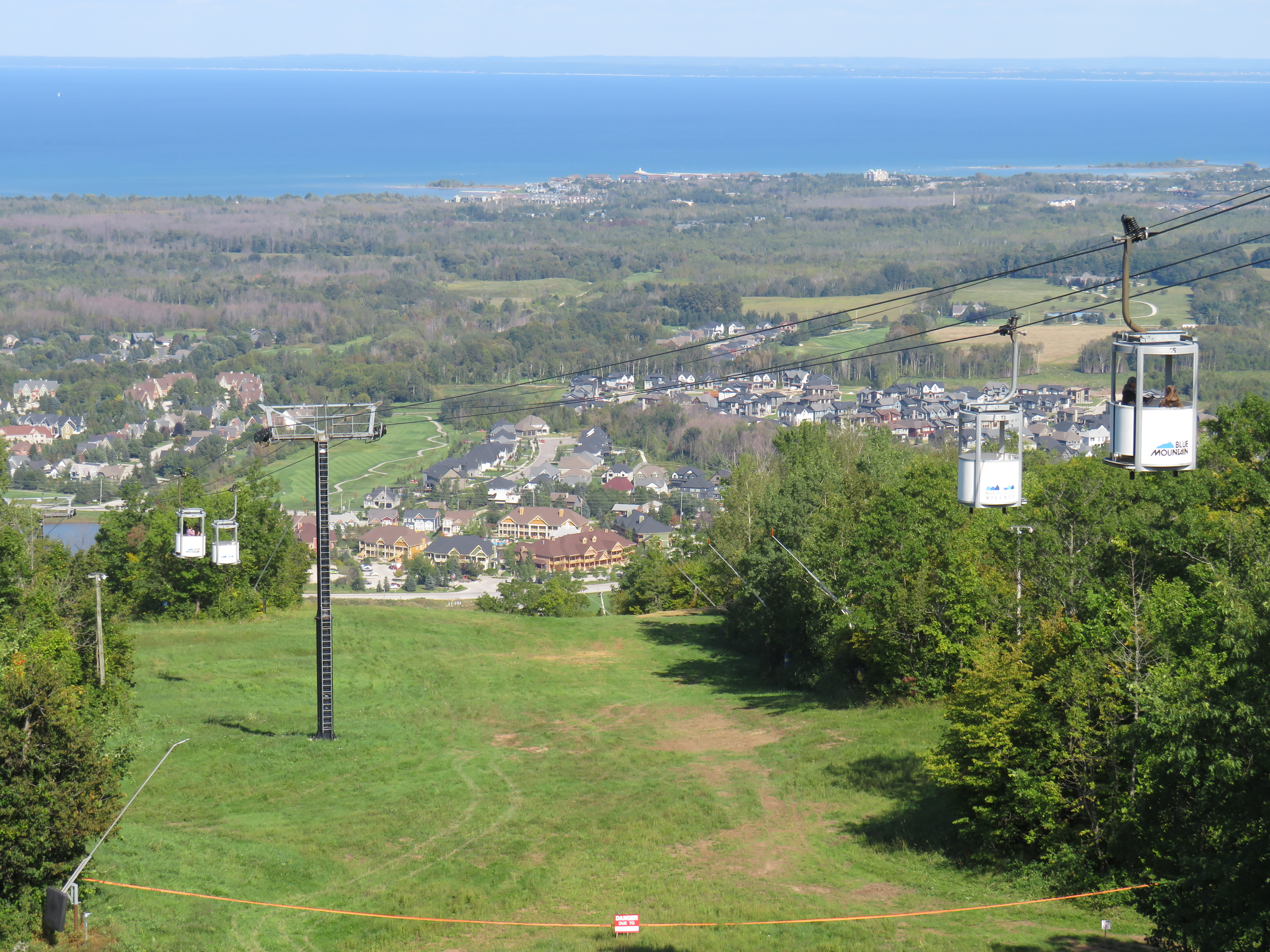
The open air gondola lift at Blue Mountain Resorts

The first ski lift on the grounds of the resort was a sleigh tow lift installed in 1937. The lift was used until it was replaced by a Poma lift in 1955. A double chairlift was opened at the resort in 1960, the first chairlift to be opened in the province. The resort built an addition double chairlift in 1965, and an additional two in 1969. By 1979, the resort had three triple chairlifts, five double chairlifts, four Poma lifts, three T-bars and one rope tow.

The resort began to replace its double chairlifts in the 1980s with the replacement of one with a quad chairlifts. This was followed with the replacement of another with a high-speed six-seat chairlift in 1997. The resort expanded the number of lifts it operated in the 2000s, replacing the chairlift the resort opened in 1960 with a high-speed six seat chairlift, adding its first magic carpet lift for use on its beginner runs, and installing an open-air gondola lift in 2004 as an attraction during the skiing off-season.

== Resort ==
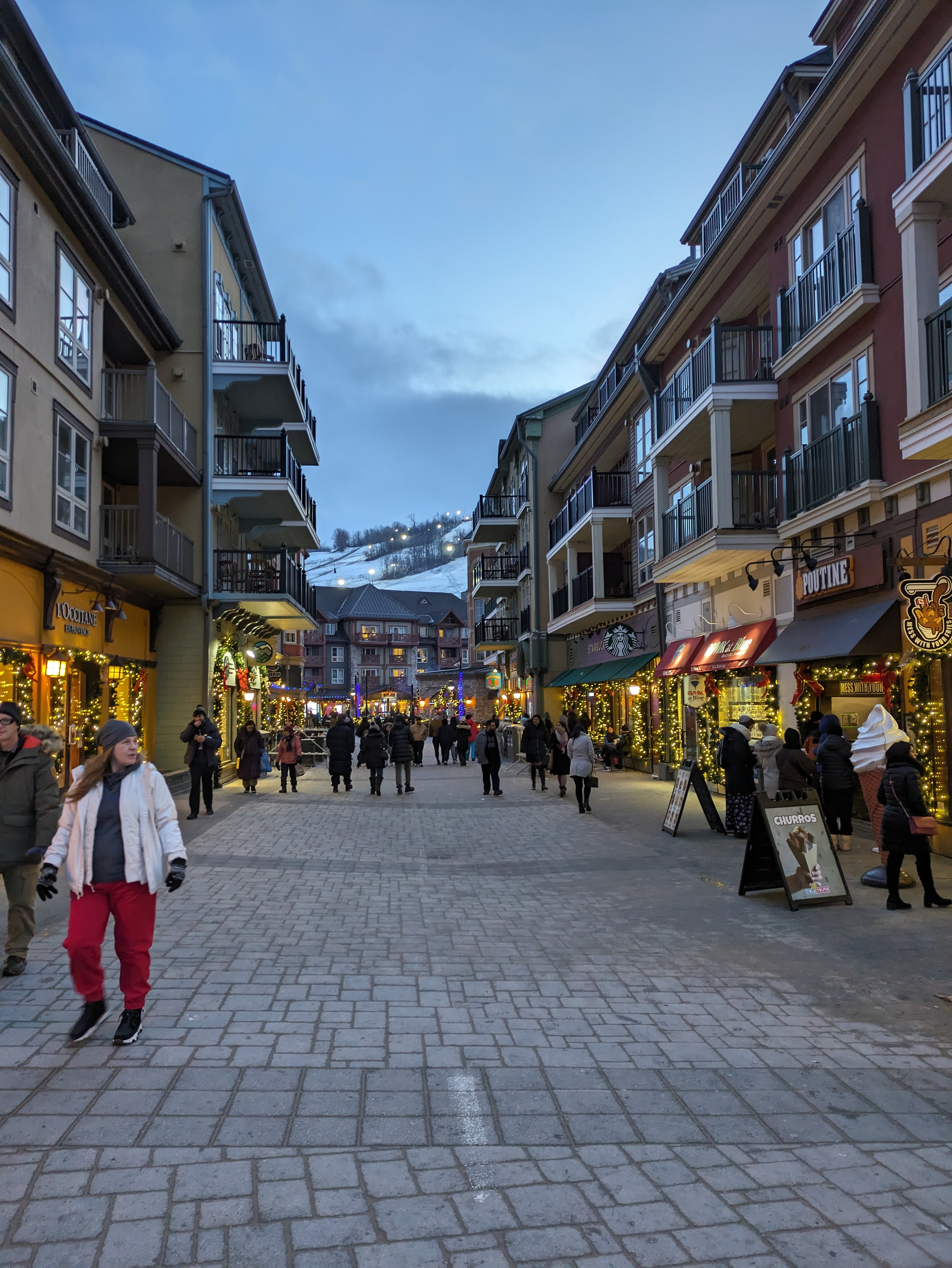
View of Blue Mountain Village looking towards the mountain

In addition to skiing and snowboarding, the resort provides access to several activities on its mountain and its resort village depending on the operating season. This includes axe throwing, golf, ice skating, mountain biking, a mountain coaster, rope courses, snow tubing, snowshoeing, swimming, tennis, ziplining, and aqua tricycle rentals.

=== Blue Mountain Village ===
Blue Mountain Village is located at the base of the mountain and serves as the central hub for the resort. The village is made up of hotels, motels, lodges, cabins, and more than 40 shops and restaurants in the village.

The resort began to make plans for Blue Mountain Village as early as 1985, although it did not begin construction on the village until 2000, after Intrawest acquired a 50 per cent stake into Blue Mountain Resorts. The Blue Mountain Village Association is a membership-based business association for organizations operating inside Blue Mountain Village. The association was formed through the Blue Mountain Village Association Act, 1999.

== Events ==
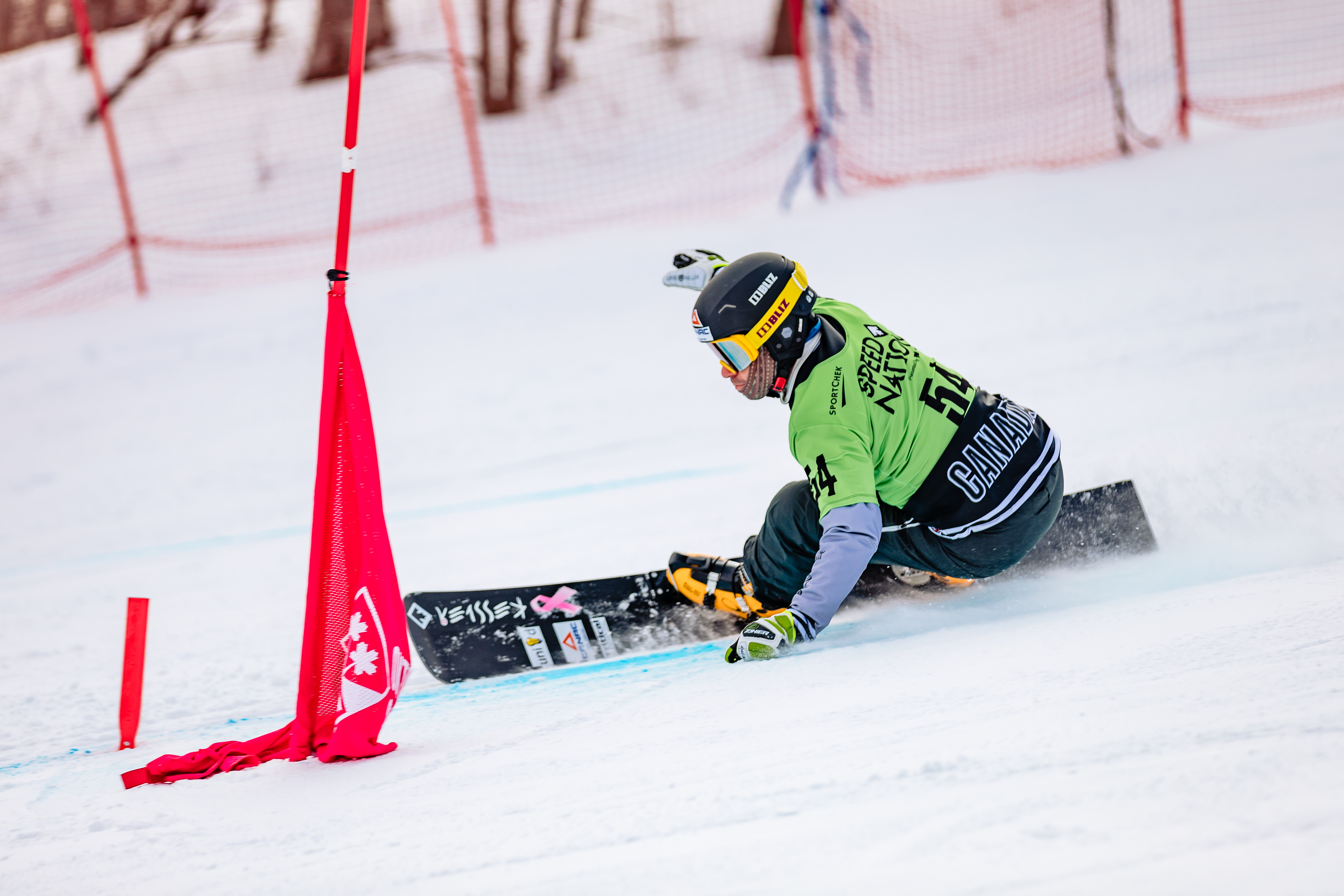
A snowboarding event held at Blue Mountain in 2019

- FIS Freestyle Skiing World Cup - Ski Cross - 2010, 2011, 2012, ~~2016~~, 2017, 2019
- FIS Snowboard World Cup - Snowboard Cross - 2012, 2013
- FIS Snowboard World Cup - Parallel Giant Slalom - 2020, 2023

== See also ==
- List of ski areas and resorts in Canada
